= List of mountains and hills of Saxony =

This list of mountains and hills of Saxony shows a selection of high and well-known mountains and hills in the German state of Saxony (in order of elevation):

Name	Height above sea level (NHN)	Natural regions	Remarks	Image
Fichtelberg	1,215 m	Western Ore Mountains	2 km northwest of Oberwiesenthal, highest mountain in Saxony	
Eisenberg	1,028 m	Western Ore Mountains	3 km north of Oberwiesenthal	
Auersberg	1,019 m	Western Ore Mountains	1 km east of Wildenthal	
Scheffelsberg	980 m	Western Ore Mountains	1 km south of Jugel	
Schneehübel	974 m	Western Ore Mountains	1 km southwest of Carlsfeld	
Brückenberg	964 m	Western Ore Mountains	1 km west of Wildenthal	
Stangenhöhe	964 m	Western Ore Mountains	3 km south of Carlsfeld the summit, at 965 metres, lies in the Czech Republic	
Großer Rammelsberg	963 m	Western Ore Mountains	3 km east of Mühlleithen	
Buchkamm	951 m	Western Ore Mountains	3 south of Oberwildenthal	
Kiel	942 m	Western Ore Mountains	north of Klingenthal	
Rehhübel	932 m	Western Ore Mountains	3 km west of Johanngeorgenstadt	
Riesenberg	923 m	Western Ore Mountains	3 km northwest of Johanngeorgenstadt	
Aschberg	917 m	Western Ore Mountains	in Klingenthal the summit, at 936 metres, lies in Czech side	
Rabenberg	913 m	Western Ore Mountains	3 km northeast of Johanngeorgenstadt	
Kahleberg	905 m	Eastern Ore Mountains	3 km southwest of Altenberg	
Bärenstein	897 m	Western Ore Mountains	2 km north of Bärenstein	
Kleiner Lugstein	896 m	Eastern Ore Mountains	south of Altenberg	
Fastenberg	891 m	Western Ore Mountains	in Johanngeorgenstadt	
Hirtstein	888 m	Central Ore Mountains	3 km southwest of Reitzenhain	
Schöne Aussicht	883 m	Western Ore Mountains	1 km south of Wildenthal	
Leistnerhübel	879 m	Western Ore Mountains	1 km south of Wildenthal	
Eselsberg	867 m	Western Ore Mountains	2 km west of Erlabrunn	
Ochsenkopf	836 m	Western Ore Mountains	1 km east of Rittersgrün	
Hundsmarter	848 m	Western Ore Mountains	2 km south of Raschau-Markersbach	
Hemmschuh	846 m	Eastern Ore Mountains	south of Rehefeld-Zaunhaus	
Ahornberg	833 m	Central Ore Mountains	2 km southeast of the Ortsteil Heidelberg (Seiffen)	
Pöhlberg	831 m	Western Ore Mountains	1 km east of Annaberg-Buchholz	
Ochsenkopf	823 m	Western Ore Mountains	7 km southwest of Schwarzenberg/Erzgeb.	
Geisingberg	824 m	Eastern Ore Mountains	2 km northwest of Geising	
Steinhübel	816 m	Central Ore Mountains	7 km southwest of Olbernhau	
Morgenleithe	811 m	Western Ore Mountains	5 km southwest of Schwarzenberg	
Scheibenberg	807 m	Western Ore Mountains	1 km south of Scheibenberg	
Traugotthöhe	806 m	Eastern Ore Mountains	southwest of Fürstenau	
Steinkuppe	806 m	Eastern Ore Mountains	in Holzhau	
Drachenkopf	805 m	Eastern Ore Mountains	1 km southeast of Nassau	
Schickelshöhe	805 m	Eastern Ore Mountains	south of Hermsdorf/Erzgeb.	
Hoher Brand	805 m	Western Ore Mountains	5 km west of Klingenthal	
Schwarzberg	802 m	Vogtland	east of Klingenthal	
Sauberg	797 m	Western Ore Mountains	1 km southwest of Breitenbrunn/Erzgeb.	
Kuhberg (Stützengrün)	794 m	Western Ore Mountains	3 km northwest of Schönheide	
Lausche	793 m	Zittau Mountains	2 km south of Waltersdorf	
Blößenstein	792 m	Eastern Ore Mountains	1 km northwest of Bad Einsiedel-Heidelberg (Seiffen/Erzgeb.)	
Schwartenberg	789 m	Eastern Ore Mountains	2 km south of Neuhausen/Erzgeb.	
Kohlhaukuppe	786 m	Eastern Ore Mountains	2 km south of Geising	
Thierberg	783 m	Vogtland	between Hammerbrücke and Tannenbergsthal	
Adlerfels	778 m	Western Ore Mountains	1 km south of Eibenstock	
Schatzenstein	760 m	Western Ore Mountains	2 km northwest of Elterlein	
Kapellenberg	759 m	Elster Mountains	1 km northwest of Schönberg	
Katzenhübel	758 m	Central Ore Mountains	1 km south of Heidelberg (Seiffen)/Erzgeb.	
Tellkoppe	756 m	Eastern Ore Mountains	1 km east of Kipsdorf	
Hochwald	749 m	Zittau Mountains	2 km south of Oybin	
Goldene Höhe	734 m	Vogtland	4 km southeast of Auerbach/Vogtl.	
Laubberg	733 m	Western Ore Mountains	5 km southeast of Auerbach	
Steinberg	732 m	Western Ore Mountains	6 km south of Schneeberg	
Greifensteine	731 m	Western Ore Mountains	3 km west of Ehrenfriedersdorf	
Saydaer Höhe	728 m	Eastern Ore Mountains	2 km north of Sayda	
Spiegelwald	728 m	Western Ore Mountains	in Grünhain-Beierfeld	
Fuchshöhe	728 m	Western Ore Mountains	7 km east of Annaberg-Buchholz	
Morgensternhöhe	711 m			
Dreibrüderhöhe	689 m	Central Ore Mountains	2 km west of Marienberg	
Plattenberg	683 m	Elster Mountains	4 km southeast of Bad Elster	
Eimberg	676 m	Vogtland	10 km east of Oelsnitz	
Steinberg b. Wernesgrün	659 m	Vogtland	immediately next to Steinberg	
Jonsberg	653 m	Zittau Mountains	east of Jonsdorf	
Buchberg	652 m	Zittau Mountains	west of Jonsdorf	
Ziegenberg	652 m	Western Ore Mountains	southeast of Zwönitz	
Schreckenberg	649 m	Western Ore Mountains	1 km west of Annaberg-Buchholz	
Oelsener Höhe	645 m	Eastern Ore Mountains	4 km south of Bad Gottleuba	
Windberg	627 m	Western Ore Mountains	northwest of Zwönitz	
Katzenstein (Affalter)	627 m	Western Ore Mountains	4 km northeast of Lößnitz	
Burgberg	617 m	Eastern Ore Mountains	near Lichtenberg/Erzgeb.	
Kohlkuppe	613 m	Eastern Ore Mountains	2 km north of Schmiedeberg	
Hirschenstein	610 m	Western Ore Mountains	4 km west of Schneeberg	
Gemauerter Stein	601 m	Western Ore Mountains	1 km west of Aue	
Großer Stein	619 m	Western Ore Mountains	3 km west of Dorfchemnitz	
Gleesberg	593 m	Western Ore Mountains	1 km east of Schneeberg	
Fröhnberg	587 m	Vogtland	5 km west of Auerbach/Vogtl.	
Valtenberg	586 m	Lusatian Highlands	3 km southwest of Neukirch/Lausitz im Hohwald	
Kottmar	583 m	Lusatian Highlands	6 km east of Ebersbach/Sa.	
Töpfer	580 m	Zittau Mountains	1 km northeast of Oybin	
Luchberg	576 m	Eastern Ore Mountains	4 km southwest of Reinhardtsgrimma	
Ameisenberg	575 m	Zittau Mountains	north of Oybin	
Schutzberg	565 m	Vogtland	3 km west of Weischlitz	
Eichert	564 m	Western Ore Mountains	in Aue	
Großer Zschirnstein	560 m	Elbe Sandstone Mountains	3 km southwest of Schöna	
Großer Winterberg	556 m	Elbe Sandstone Mountains	7 km east of Bad Schandau	
Czorneboh	555 m	Lusatian Highlands	3 km north of Cunewalde	
Keilberg (Schneeberg)	551 m	Western Ore Mountains	northwest of Schneeberg	
Hochstein	542 m	Lusatian Highlands	5 km south of Hochkirch	
Ungerberg	537 m	Elbe Sandstone Mountains	4 km northwest of Sebnitz	
Geiersberg	536 m	Ore Mountains	2 km northeast of Burkhardtsdorf	
Lerchenberg (Plauen)	525 m	Vogtland	10 km northwest of Plauen	
Alter Berg	524 m	Vogtland	6 km southeast of Plauen	
Ottoberg	520 m	Zittau Mountains	east of Waltersdorf	
Hirschknochen	517 m	Western Ore Mountains	in Aue	
Eisenstein	516 m	Western Ore Mountains	2 km east of Aue	
Schellenberg	516 m	Ore Mountains	in Augustusburg, 12 km east of Chemnitz	
Brünlasberg	514 m	Western Ore Mountains	in Aue	
Oybin	513 m	Zittau Mountains	immediately next to Oybin	
Heidelsberg	512 m	Western Ore Mountains	in Aue	
Kuhberg (Brockau)	511 m	Vogtland	2 km southwest of Netzschkau	
Oberoderwitzer Spitzberg	510 m	Lusatian Highlands	south of Oderwitz	
Breiteberg	510.3 m	Zittau Mountains	2 km south of Hainewalde	
Adelsberg	508 m	Ore Mountains	in Chemnitz-Adelsberg	
Augustusberg	507 m	Eastern Ore Mountains	near Bad Gottleuba	
Kemmler	507 m	Vogtland	3 km southeast of Plauen	
Weifaer Höhe	504 m	Lusatian Highlands	1 km northeast of Weifa	
Kleiner Winterberg	499.9 m	Saxon Switzerland	3 km northeast of Schmilka	
Bieleboh	499 m	Lusatian Highlands	3 km south of Cunewalde	
Großer Picho	498 m	Lusatian Highlands	3 km west of Wilthen	
Sängerhöhe	497 m	Zittau Mountains	west of Waltersdorf	
Wachberg	496 m	Elbe Sandstone Mountains	1 km north of Saupsdorf	
Udohöhe	496 m	Ore Mountains	1 km northwest of Oederan	
Götzhöhe	493 m	Ore Mountains	north of Zschopau	
Großes Horn	493 m	Elbe Sandstone Mountains	east of Bad Gottleuba	
Schlechteberg	485 m	Lusatian Highlands	in Ebersbach	
Langenberger Höhe	484 m	Saxon Uplands	2 km north of Hohenstein-Ernstthal	
Totenstein	483 m	Saxon Uplands	1 km north of Chemnitz-Grüna	
Pfaffenberg	479 m	Saxon Uplands	1 km north of Hohenstein-Ernstthal	
Weifberg	478 m	Elbe Sandstone Mountains	2 km north of Hinterhermsdorf	
Wilisch	476 m	Eastern Ore Mountains	3 km south of Kreischa	
Frenzelsberg	474 m	Lusatian Highlands	west of Seifhennersdorf	
Kleiner Zschirnstein	473 m	Elbe Sandstone Mountains	6 km east of Bad Schandau	
Großer Stein (Lusatian Highlands)	471 m	Lusatian Highlands	south of Leutersdorf	
Richterberg	470 m	Lusatian Highlands	east of Seifhennersdorf	
Sonnenhübel	469 m	Lusatian Highlands	1.5 km east of Oderwitz	
Lerchenberg	466.6 m	Lusatian Highlands	between Neugersdorf and Eibau	
Raumberg	459 m	Elbe Sandstone Mountains	10 km southeast of Sebnitz	
Forstenberg	458.8 m	Lusatian Highlands	south of Spitzkunnersdorf	
Rotstein	455 m	Upper Lusatia	west of Sohland am Rotstein	
Papststein	451 m	Elbe Sandstone Mountains	1 km southeast of Gohrisch	
Schafberg	449.5 m	Upper Lusatia	east of Löbau	
Löbauer Berg	449 m	Upper Lusatia	1 km east of Löbau	
Hochstein	449 m	West Lusatian Hill Country and Uplands	3 km southeast of Elstra	
Gohrisch	448 m	Elbe Sandstone Mountains	1 km south of Gohrisch	
Mönchswalder Berg	447 m	Lusatian Highlands	3 km north of Wilthen	
Hoher Hahn	446 m	Lusatian Highlands	south of Tröbigau	
Lampertsstein	440 m	Elbe Sandstone Mountains	5 km south of Königstein	
Großer Berg	438 m	Lusatian Highlands	north of Großhennersdorf	
Schenkenberg	434 m	am Südrand von Chemnitz	in the village of Reichenhain	
Pfaffenstein	434 m	Elbe Sandstone Mountains	2 km south of Königstein	
Thromberg	432 m	Lusatian Highlands	6 km southeast of the town centre of Bautzen	
Schönbrunner Berg	427.7 m	Lusatian Highlands	northeast of Großhennersdorf	
Götzinger Höhe	424 m	Lusatian Highlands	near Neustadt	
Scheibenberg	422.7 m	Lusatian Highlands	west of Mittelherwigsdorf	
Beutenberg	421 m	Saxon Uplands	Zeisigwald on the northeastern perimeter of Chemnitz	
Schwedenstein	420 m	West Lusatian Hill Country and Uplands	3 km east of Pulsnitz	
Windmühlenberg	420 m	Lusatian Highlands	north of Seifhennersdorf	
Weißer Stein	420 m	Lusatian Highlands	southwest of Spitzkunnersdorf	
Landeskrone	419 m	Upper Lusatia	5 km southwest of Görlitz	
Lilienstein	416 m	Elbe Sandstone Mountains	2 km north of Königstein	
Pfaffenberg	416 m	Lusatian Highlands	north of Großschönau	
Kämpferberge	415 m	Königshain Hills	4 km west of Königshain	
Waitzdorfer Höhe	413 m	Saxon Switzerland	3 km south of Hohnstein	
Schwarzenberg	413 m	West Lusatian Hill Country and Uplands	1 km west of Elstra	
Keulenberg	413 m	West Lusatian Hill Country and Uplands	2 km southeast of Königsbrück	
Hofeberg	413 m	Lusatian Highlands	2 km east of Leutersdorf	
Finkenhübel	410.6 m	Lusatian Highlands	west of Großschönau	
Schanzberg	408.6 m	Lusatian Highlands	northeast of Oberseifersdorf	
Beckenberg	407.6 m	Lusatian Highlands	north of Eibau	
Hochstein	406 m	Eastern Upper Lusatia	4 km northwest of Königshain	
Pferdeberg	406 m	Lusatian Highlands	east of Oderwitz	
Hutberg	405 m	Lusatian Highlands	east of Oderwitz	
Wäschberg	401.7 m	Ore Mountains	500 m northwest of Bräunsdorf	
Tröbigauer Berg	401 m	Lusatian Highlands	north of Tröbigau	
Lasensteine	399 m	Saxon Switzerland	2 km south of Krippen	
Fuchsberg	398 m	Saxon Uplands	Zeisigwald on the northeastern edge of Chemnitz	
Schwarzer Berg	394 m	Upper Lusatia	1 km west of Jauernick-Buschbach	
Klosterberg	394 m	Lusatian Highlands	south of Demitz-Thumitz	
Spitzer Berg	393 m	Lusatian Highlands	south of Großhennersdorf	
Cottaer Spitzberg	391 m	Elbe Sandstone Mountains	1 km east of Cotta	
Kleinhennersdorfer Stein	389 m	Elbe Sandstone Mountains	3 km west of Bad Schandau	
Tröbigauer Butterberg	388 m	Lusatian Highlands	between Tröbigau and Naundorf	
Kühnelsberg	386 m	Lusatian Highlands	north of Oderwitz	
Zirkelstein	384.5 m	Saxon Switzerland	5 km southeast of Bad Schandau	
Triebenberg	383 m	Schönfeld Upland	highest point of Dresden	
Steinberg	378 m	Ore Mountains	0,5 km east of Riechberg	
Höhe	376.6 m	Lusatian Highlands	east of Eibau	
Bubenik	376 m	Lusatian Highlands	4 km west of Löbau	
Funkenburg	376 m	Lusatian Highlands	1 km northeast of Wehrsdorf	
Langer Berg	375 m	Lusatian Highlands	west of Großhennersdorf	
Jungfernstein	373.2 m	Lusatian Highlands	northeast of Tröbigau	
Gleichenstein	373 m	Ore Mountains	1 km east of Bräunsdorf	
Kohlbornstein	371 m	Elbe Sandstone Mountains	1 km south of Krippen	
Wilhelmshöhe	368 m	Lusatian Highlands	west of Oderwitz	
Borsberg	361 m	Schönfeld Upland	in the east of Dresden	
Königstein	360.6 m	Elbe Sandstone Mountains	1 km west of Königstein	
Steinberg	357 m	Lusatian Highlands	north of Wittgendorf	
Windberg (Freital)	352 m	Saxon Uplands	in Freital	
Kaiserkrone	351 m	Elbe Sandstone Mountains	near Schöna	
Quirl	350 m	Elbe Sandstone Mountains	2 km south of Königstein	
Rochlitzer Berg	348 m	near Rochlitz	old volcano	
Gohlig (Goldene Höhe)	346 m	Saxon Uplands	1 km south of Bannewitz	
Wolfsberg	343 m	Elbe Sandstone Mountains	1 km south of Reinhardtsdorf-Schöna	
Kleiner Bärenstein	338 m	Elbe Sandstone Mountains	1 km north of Thürmsdorf	
Eisberg	330 m	Lusatian Highlands	west of Großhennersdorf	
Großer Bärenstein	330 m	Elbe Sandstone Mountains	2 km southeast of Stadt Wehlen	
Schöne Höhe	328 m	Elbe Sandstone Mountains	1 km southwest of Dürrröhrsdorf-Dittersbach	
Sandberg	323.8 m	Lusatian Highlands	north of Schlegel	
Baeyerhöhe	320.5 m	Meißen Upland	municipality of Klipphausen	
Collmberg	312 m	Leipzig Bay	6 km west of Oschatz	
Schülerberg	306 m	Lusatian Highlands	north of Mittelherwigsdorf	
Bastei	305 m	Elbe Sandstone Mountains	1 km west of Rathen	
Rauenstein	304 m	Elbe Sandstone Mountains	2 km southeast of Stadt Wehlen	
Hutberg	297 m	West Lusatian Hill Country and Uplands	2 km west of Kamenz	
Monumentberg	293 m	Upper Lusatia	1 km east of Groß Radisch	
Strohmberg	264 m	Lusatian Highlands (Vorland)	2,5 km south of Weißenberg	
Wahnsdorfer Kuppe	246.4 m	Lößnitz	5 km south Moritzburg	
Löbenberg	240 m	Leipzig Bay	2 km northwest of Hohburg	
Reichenberg	223 m	Lößnitz	municipality of Moritzburg	
Oßlinger Berg	204 m	Upper Lusatia	1 km west of Oßling	
Heidehöhe; Heideberg near Gröden	201 m	Großenhainer Pflege	2 km north of Strauch	

== See also ==
- List of mountain and hill ranges in Germany
- List of the highest mountains in Germany
- List of the highest mountains in the German states
- List of mountains in the Ore Mountains
