= Schwarzer Berg =

Schwarzer Berg may refer to:

- Schwarzer Berg (Jauernick), a mountain of Saxony, Germany
- Schwarzer Berg (Spessart), a hill of Hesse, Germany
