= Ochsenkopf =

Ochsenkopf, German for "ox's head", may refer to:

- Operation Ochsenkopf, a battle during the Second World War
- Ochsenkopf (Malbun), a mountain on the border of Liechtenstein and Austria
- Ochsenkopf (Fichtel Mountains), a mountain in Upper Franconia, Bavaria
- Ochsenkopf (Jägerhaus), a mountain of Saxony, southeastern Germany
- Ochsenkopf (Rittersgrün), a mountain of Saxony, southeastern Germany
- Ochsenkopf (Kitzbühel Alps), a mountain of the Alps
- Ochsenkopf Transmitter, a radio and TV transmitter for the Bayerischer Rundfunk

== See also ==
- Hoher Ochsenkopf, a mountain in the Black Forest, Baden-Württemberg
