= Ochsenkopf (Rittersgrün) =

Ochsenkopf bei Rittersgrün
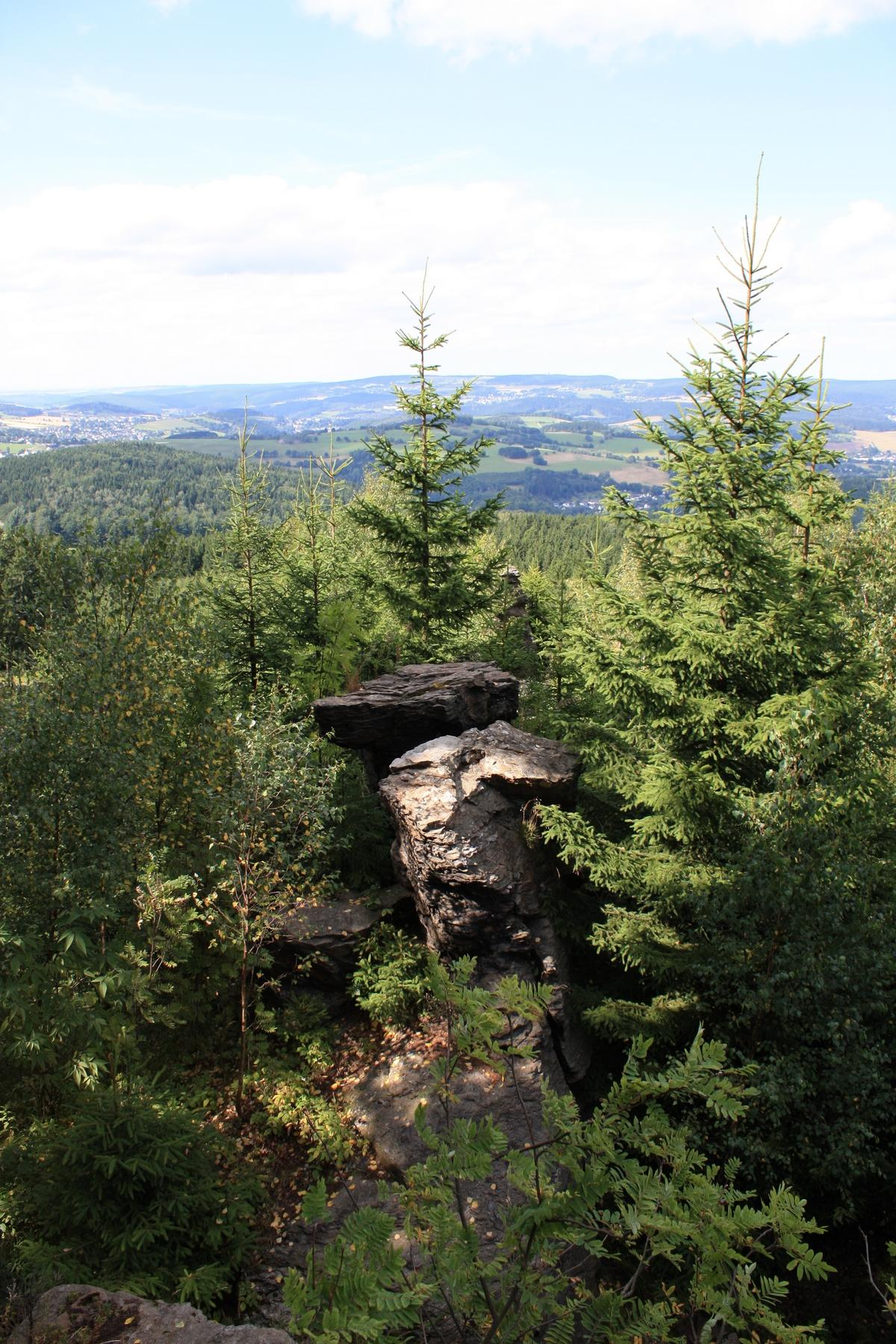
- View from the Ochsenkopf towards Spiegelwald

Highest point
- Elevation: 835.7 m (2,742 ft)
- Coordinates: 50°28′52″N 12°48′52″E

Geography
- Location: Erzgebirgskreis, Saxony, Germany

Geology
- Rock type: Schist

The Ochsenkopf bei Rittersgrün is a mountain of Saxony, southeastern Germany. It is located near the village of Rittersgrün in the Erzgebirgskreis district.

The mountain is accessible via Hammerberg Road. The shortest route to the summit is via the footpath from the Waldburg, a restaurant built in 1903/04. At its summit, there are a number of light-colored schist rocks. There is also a rest area.

Due to the dense foliage, there is no view from the summit of the surrounding area. However, various vantage points lower down offer good panoramic views of the Pöhlwasser Valley. On the horizon, mountain peaks between Auersberg and Morgenleithe are visible.

Below the Ochsenkopf, at the edge of the forest, is the Rittersgrün waterworks. The facility marks the beginning of a nearly 15 km hiking trail that follows Altpöhlaer Street and leads to the Fichtelberg, another mountain.
