= Mönchswalder Berg =

Mountain in Saxony, Germany

Coordinates: 51°07′N 14°25′E

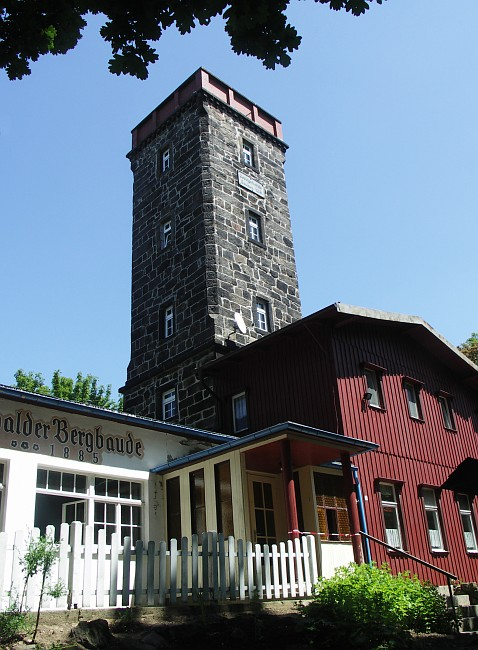

Highest point
- Elevation: 447.4 m (1,468 ft)

Geography
- Location: Saxony, Germany

Mönchswalder Berg (Upper Sorbian: Mnišonc) is a hill belonging to the district of Bautzen in Saxony, Germany. It is a part of the Lusatian Highlands and lays approximately 3 km North of Wilthen.

Panorama

The best panoramic view can be enjoyed from the top of the viewing tower. To the North, the land is flat and one sees the city of Bautzen, Bautzen Reservoir, the Boxberg Power-plant and by clear weather the smokestacks of the power-plant at Schwarze Pumpe. To the South, the Valtenberg, the Ungerberg with its unambiguous observation tower and a few peaks from the Saxon Switzerland such as the Big and Small Zschirnstein are visible. To the West, the big Picho with its antenna tower whilst to the East, the Czorneboh, Hochstein, Bieleboh, Lausche, Tannenberg and Jeschken. Peaks from the Jizera and Giant Mountains can be observed only under placid weather conditions.
