= Thierberg (Vogtland) =

Coordinates: 50°26′45″N 12°26′35″E

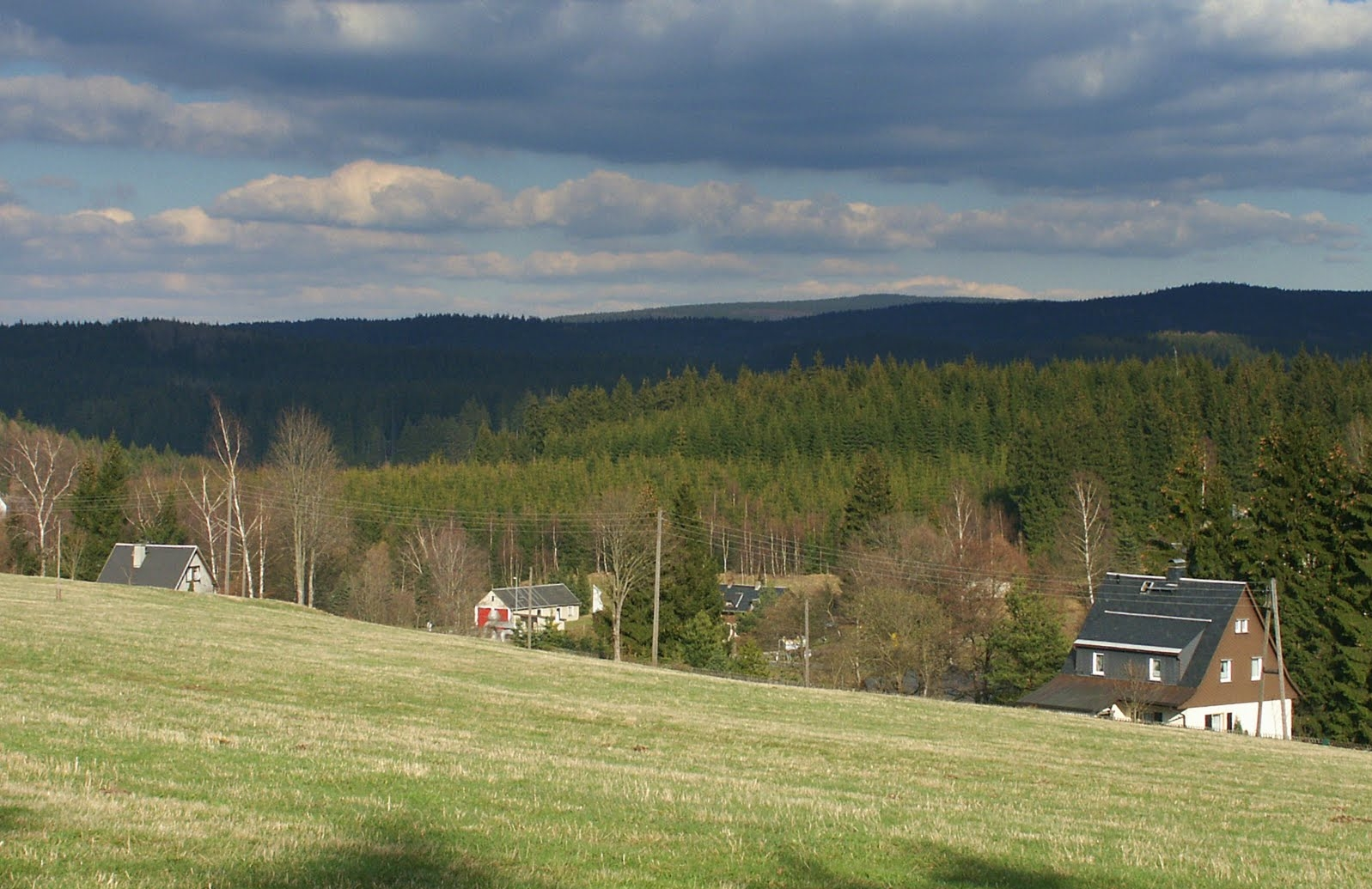
- View from the eastern slope of the Thierberg to Jägersgrün

Highest point
- Elevation: 783 m (2,569 ft)

Geography
- Location: Saxony, Germany

Thierberg is a mountain of Saxony, southeastern Germany.
