= Morgensternhöhe =

Mountain in Saxony, Germany

Coordinates: 50°39′N 13°15′E

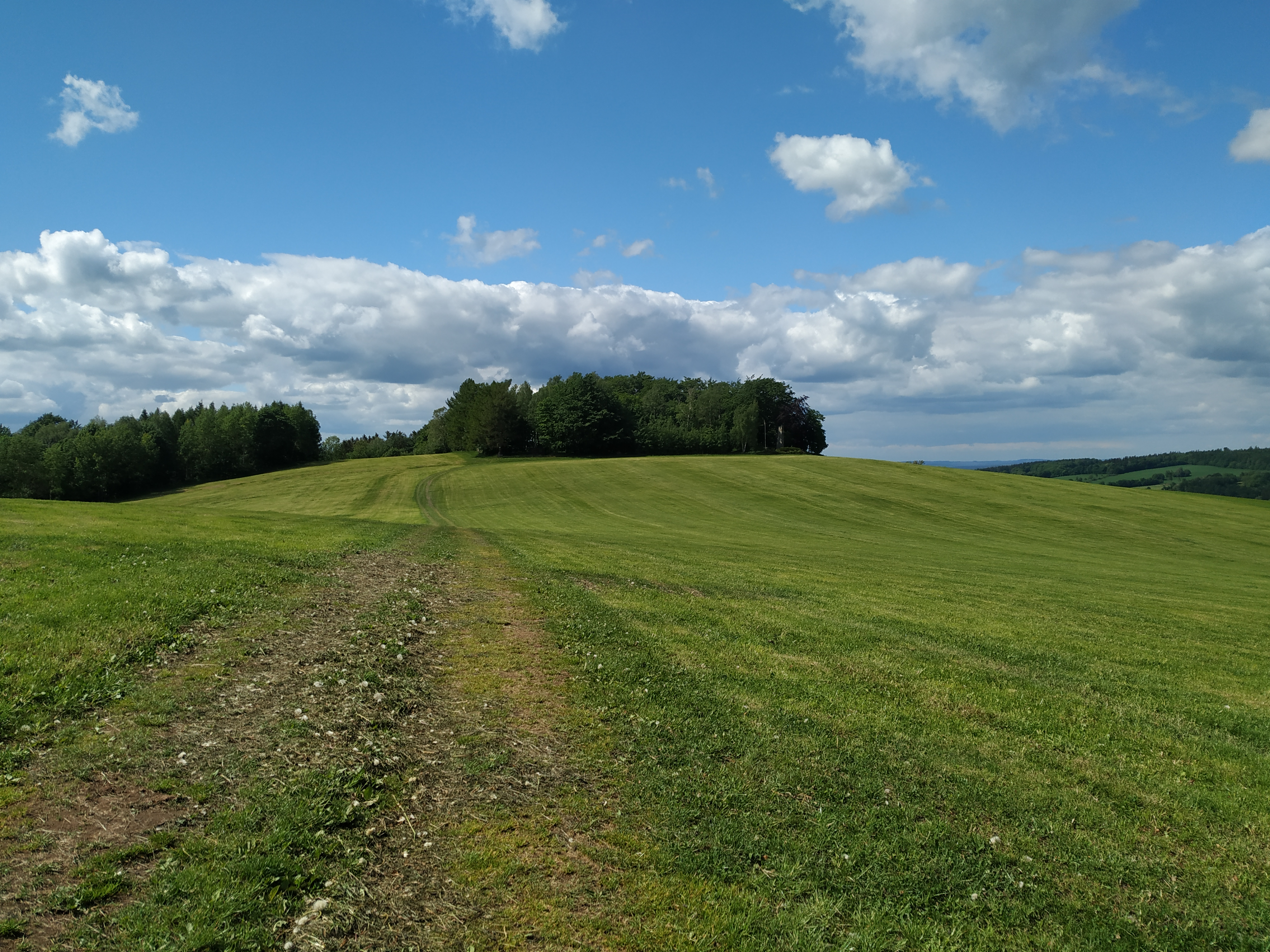
- The Morgensternhöhe

Highest point
- Elevation: 771 m (2,530 ft)

Geography
- Location: Saxony, Germany

Morgensternhöhe is a mountain of Saxony, southeastern Germany.
