= Sonnenhübel =

Mountain in Germany

Coordinates: 50°58′N 14°47′E

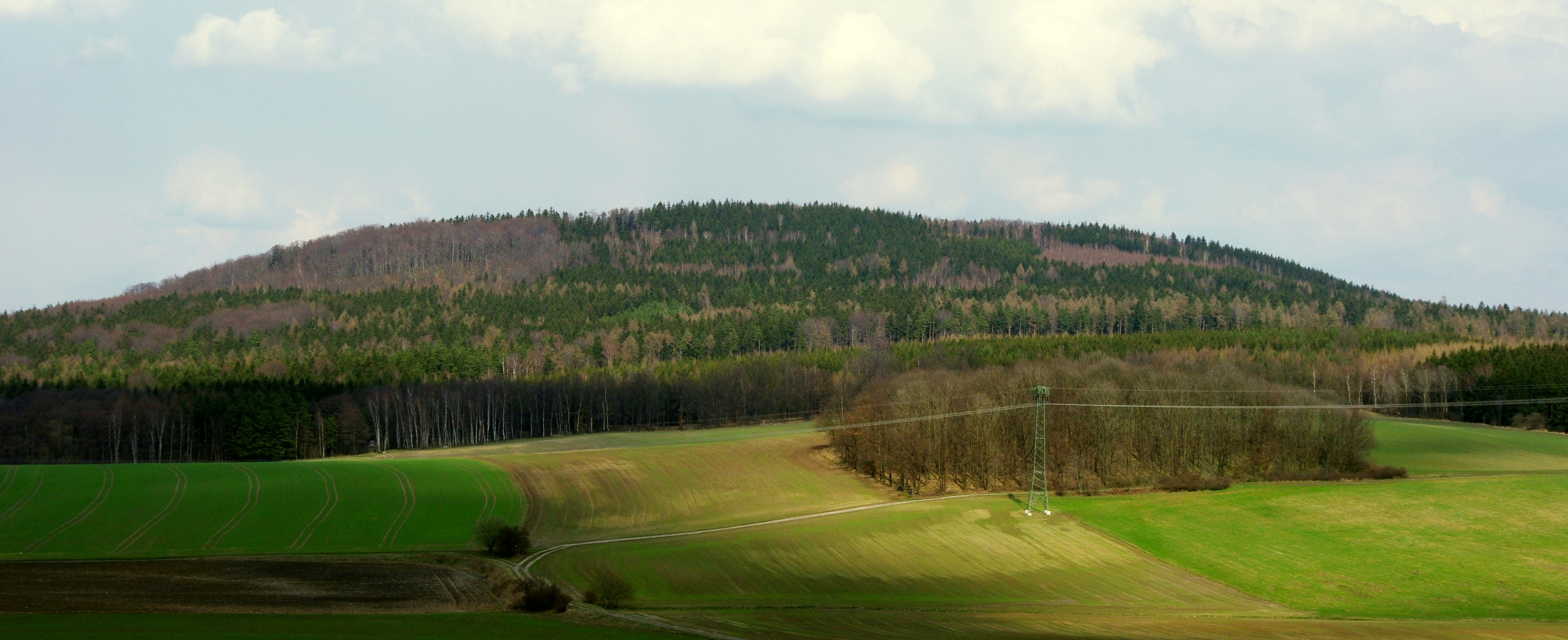

Highest point
- Elevation: 469 m (1,539 ft)

Geography
- Location: Saxony, Germany

Sonnenhübel (Upper Sorbian: Słonečna Hórka) is a mountain of Saxony, southeastern Germany.
