= Eichert (Aue) =

Coordinates: 50°35′50″N 12°42′20″E

Highest point
- Elevation: 564 m (1,850 ft)

Geography
- Location: Saxony, Germany

Eichert is a mountain of Saxony, southeastern Germany.
