= Brünlasberg =

Coordinates: 50°34′31″N 12°40′41″E

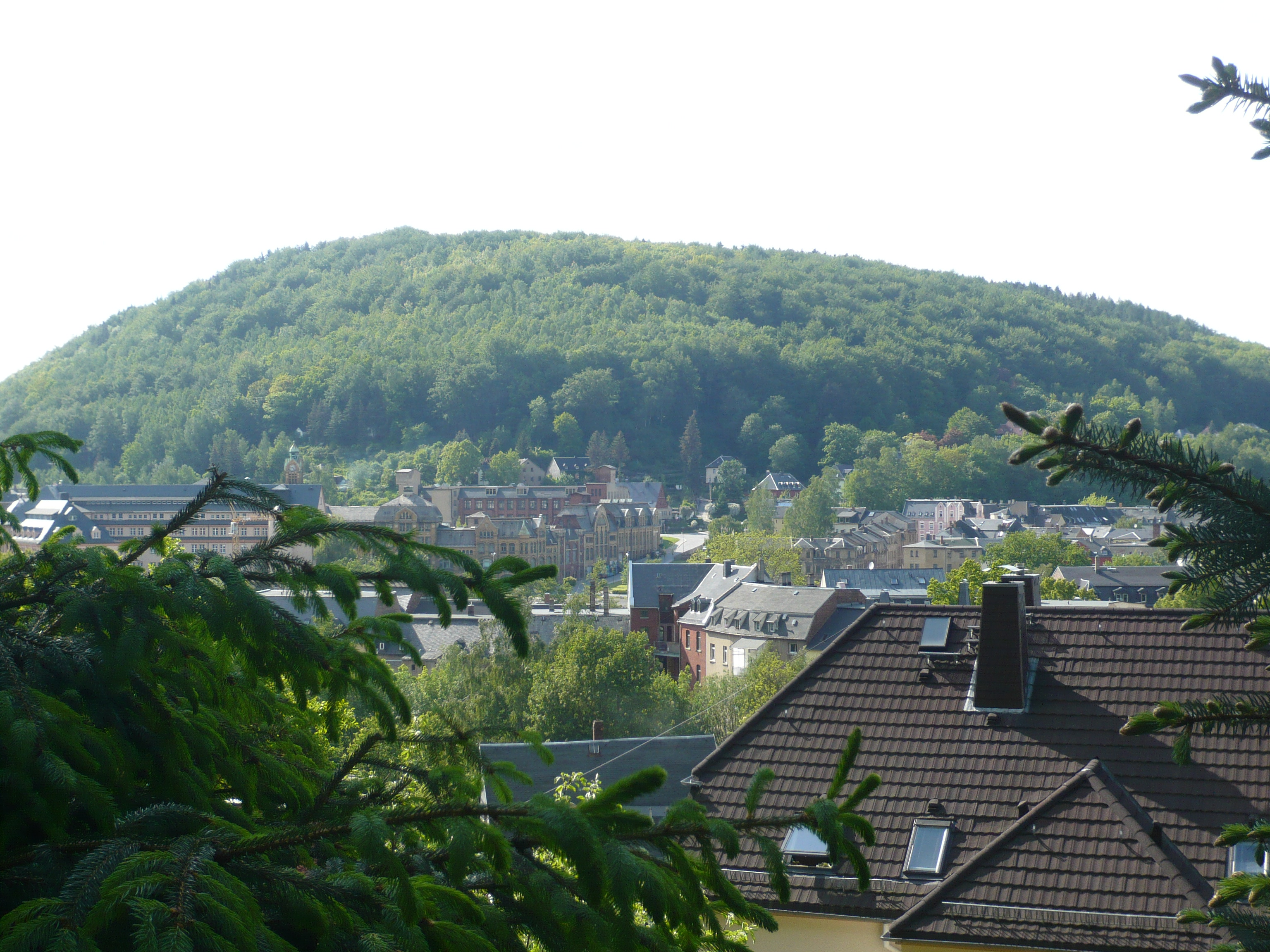
- The Brünlasberg with parts of Aue

Highest point
- Elevation: 514 m (1,686 ft)

Geography
- Location: Aue, Saxony, Germany

Brünlasberg is a mountain of Saxony, southeastern Germany.
