= Götzhöhe =

Mountain in Saxony, Germany

Coordinates: 50°46′N 13°02′E

Highest point
- Elevation: 493.3 m (1,618 ft)

Geography
- Location: Saxony, Germany

Götzhöhe is a mountain of Saxony, southeastern Germany.
