= Riesenberg (Ore Mountains) =

Mountain in Saxony, Germany

Coordinates: 50°27′41″N 12°40′18″E

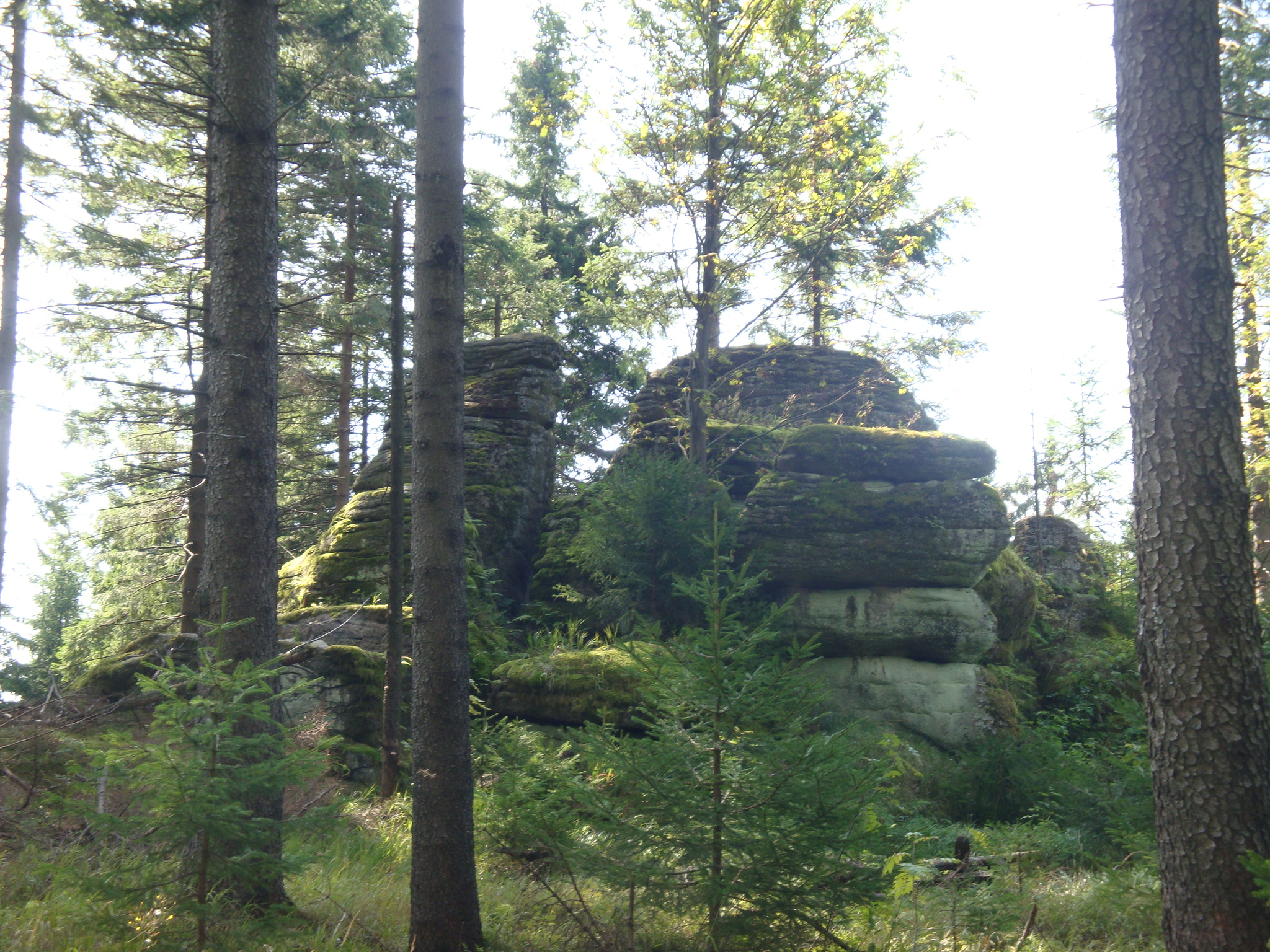
- Summit rock of Riesenberg.

Highest point
- Elevation: 923 m (3,028 ft)

Geography
- Location: Saxony, Germany

Riesenberg is a mountain of Saxony, southeastern Germany.
