= Adlerfels =

Mountain in Germany

- View from the top of Adlerfels

Highest point
- Elevation: 778 m (2,552 ft)
- Coordinates: 50°29′03″N 12°35′44″E

Geography
- Location within Saxony
- Location: Saxony, Germany
- Parent range: Ore Mountains

Adlerfels (lit. 'Eagle Rock') is a mountain of Saxony in southeastern Germany.

== Description ==
Adlerfels is a prominent rock formation and mountain peak situated in the Ore Mountains of Saxony, near the town of Eibenstock. Reaching an elevation of approximately 805 meters above sea level, it serves as a significant landmark within the Western Ore Mountains. Geologically, the mountain is characterized by its rugged granite structures, which are typical of the batholith formations found throughout the region. The area surrounding the summit is heavily forested and is integrated into a network of regional hiking trails, making it a notable site for nature tourism and local history. Historically, the peak has served as a vantage point for forestry management and was popularized during the late 19th-century expansion of mountaineering clubs in Germany.
