= Schwarzberg (Vogtland) =

Mountain in Germany

Coordinates: 50°06′N 11°05′E

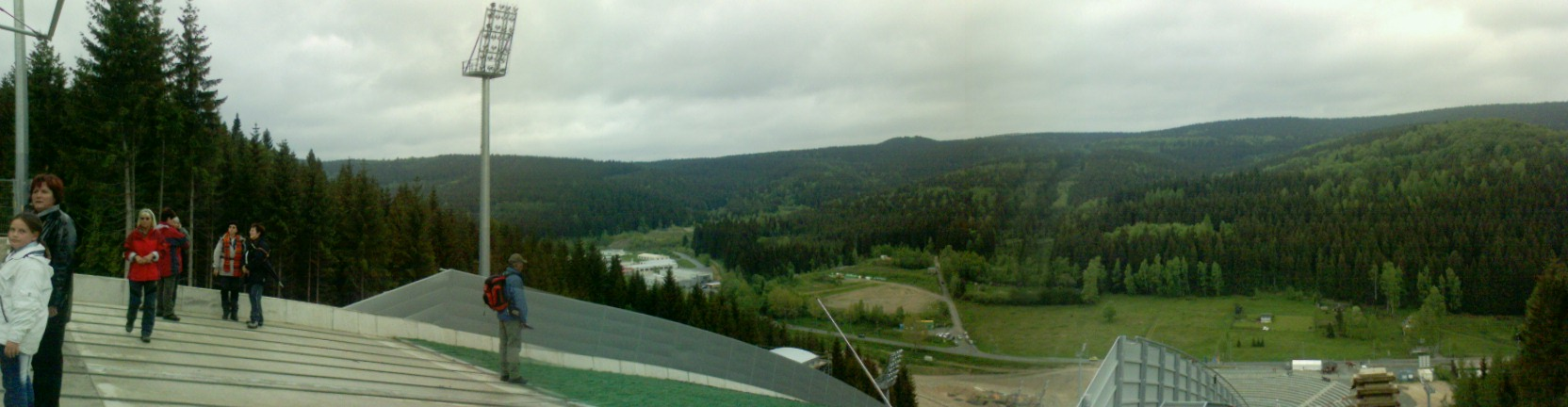
- View from the run of the large hill towards the Schneckensteinhalden.

Highest point
- Elevation: 802 m (2,631 ft)

Geography
- Location: Saxony, Germany

Schwarzberg is a mountain of Saxony, southeastern Germany.
