= Großer Stein (Lusatian Highlands) =

Mountain in Germany

Coordinates: 50°56′31″N 14°39′33″E

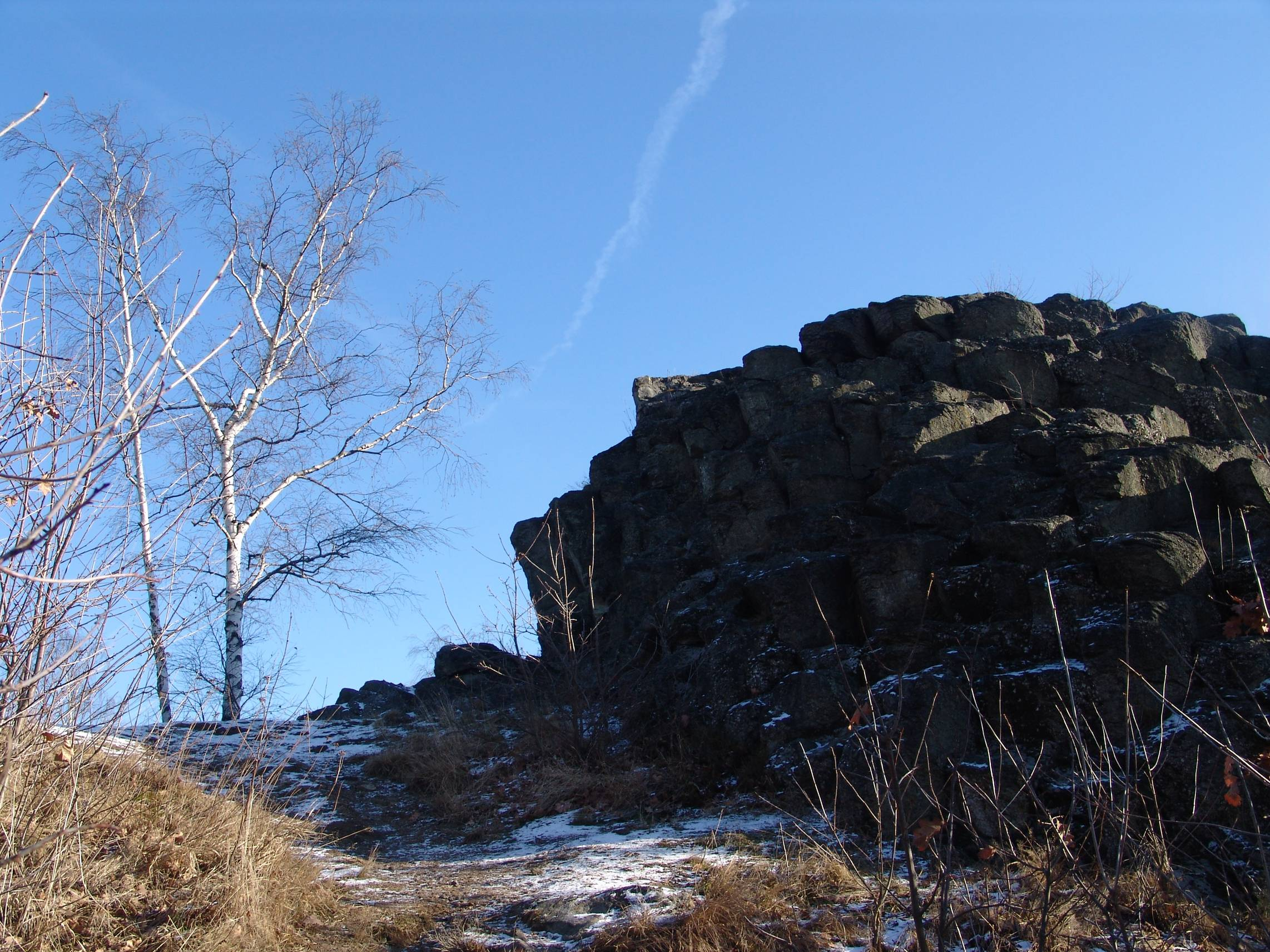
- Großer Stein

Highest point
- Elevation: 471 m (1,545 ft)

Geography
- Location: Saxony, Germany

Großer Stein is a mountain in Saxony, southeastern Germany.
