= Baeyerhöhe =

Mountain in Germany

Coordinates: 51°05′N 13°28′E

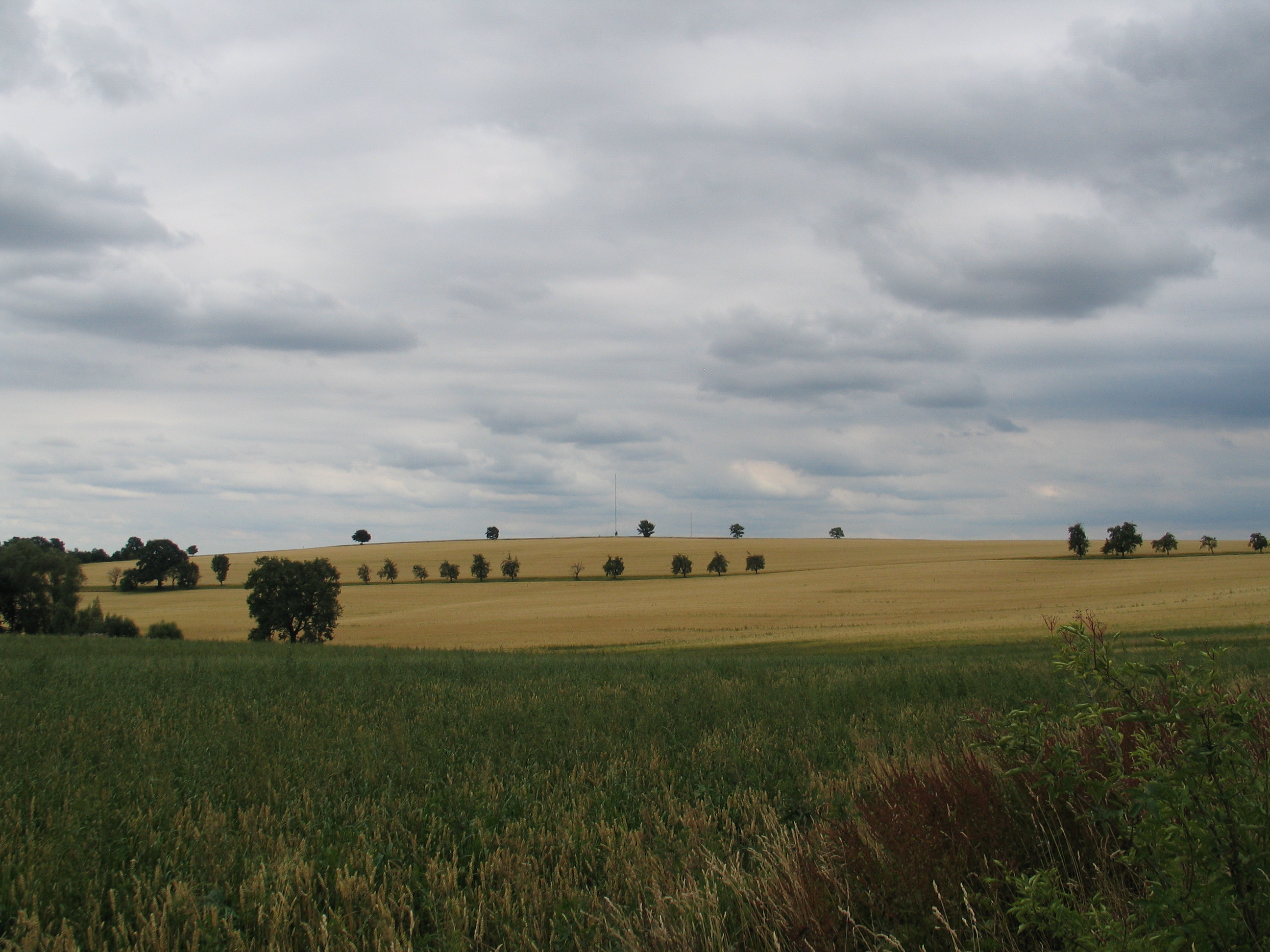
- View of the Baeyerhöhe.

Highest point
- Elevation: 320 m (1,050 ft)

Geography
- Location: Saxony, Germany

Baeyerhöhe is a mountain of Saxony, southeastern Germany.
