= Steinberg bei Wernesgrün =

Mountain in Germany

Coordinates: 50°32′36″N 12°28′08″E

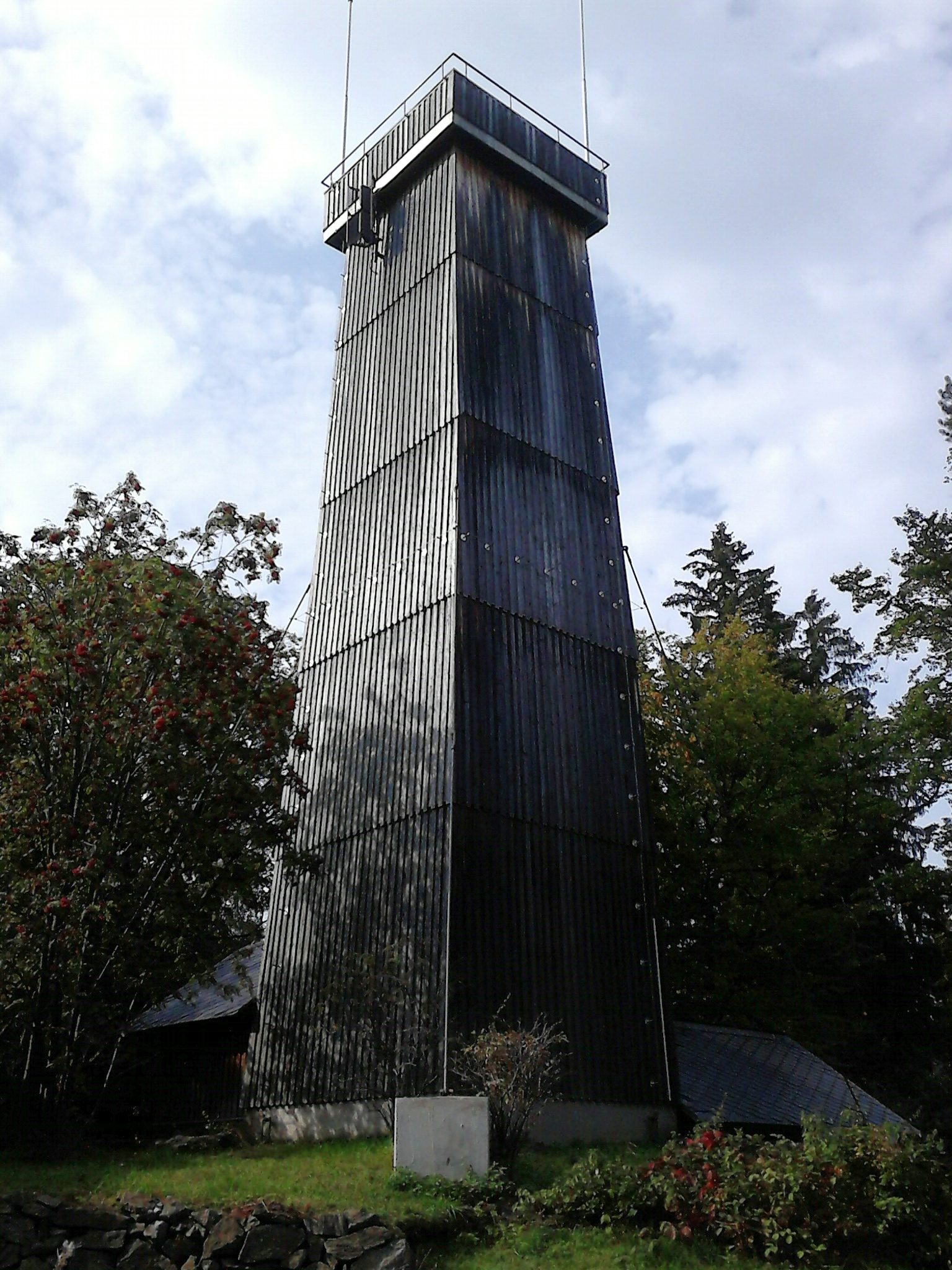
- The lookout tower on the Steinberg.

Highest point
- Elevation: 659 m (2,162 ft)

Geography
- Location: Saxony, Germany

Steinberg bei Wernesgrün is a mountain of Saxony, southeastern Germany.
