= Gleesberg =

Coordinates: 50°35′26″N 12°39′35″E

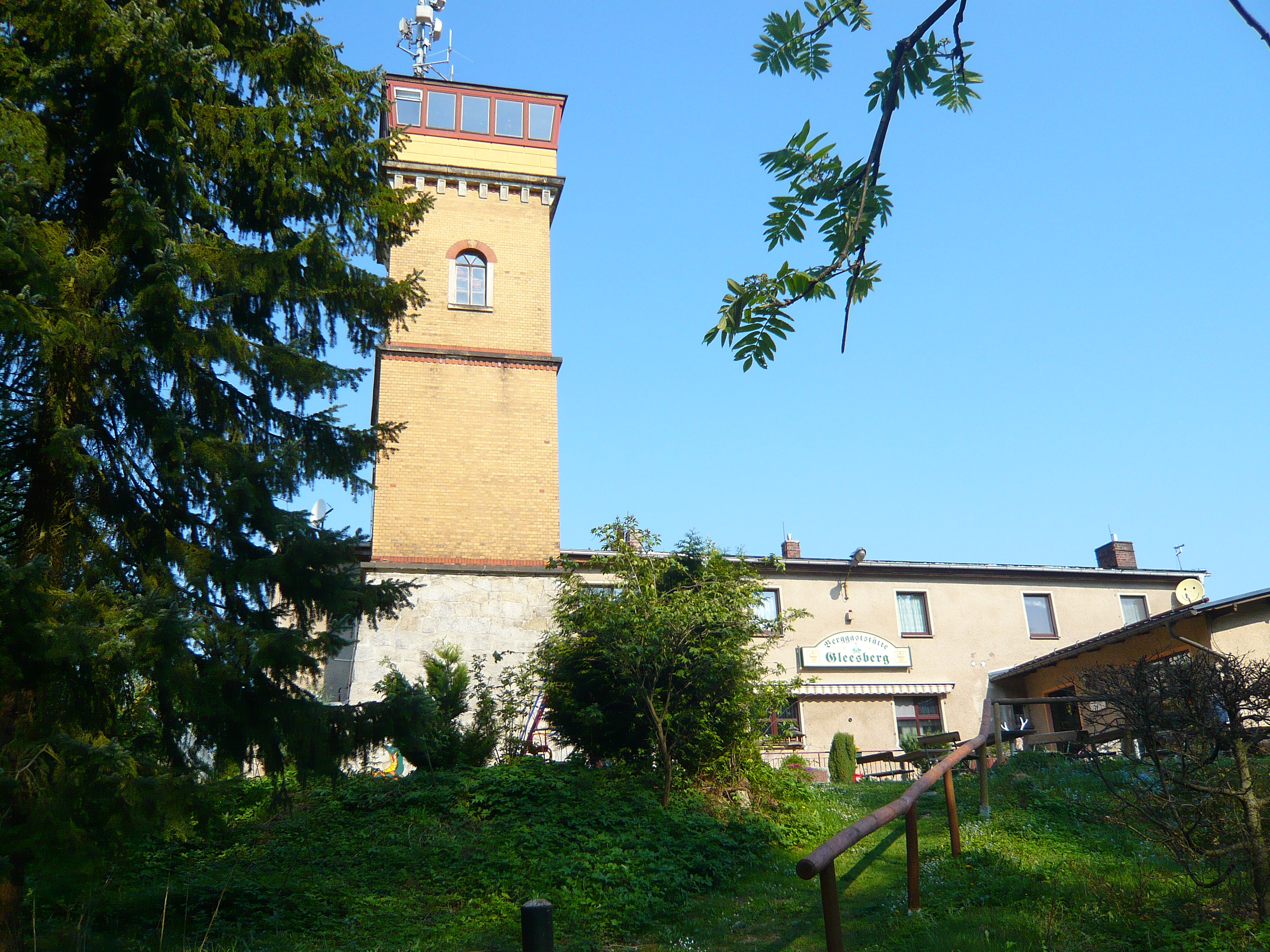
- The Gleesberg mountain inn

Highest point
- Elevation: 593 m (1,946 ft)

Geography
- Location: Saxony, Germany

Gleesberg is a mountain of Saxony, southeastern Germany.
