= Steinkuppe =

Coordinates: 50°43′13″N 13°35′55″E

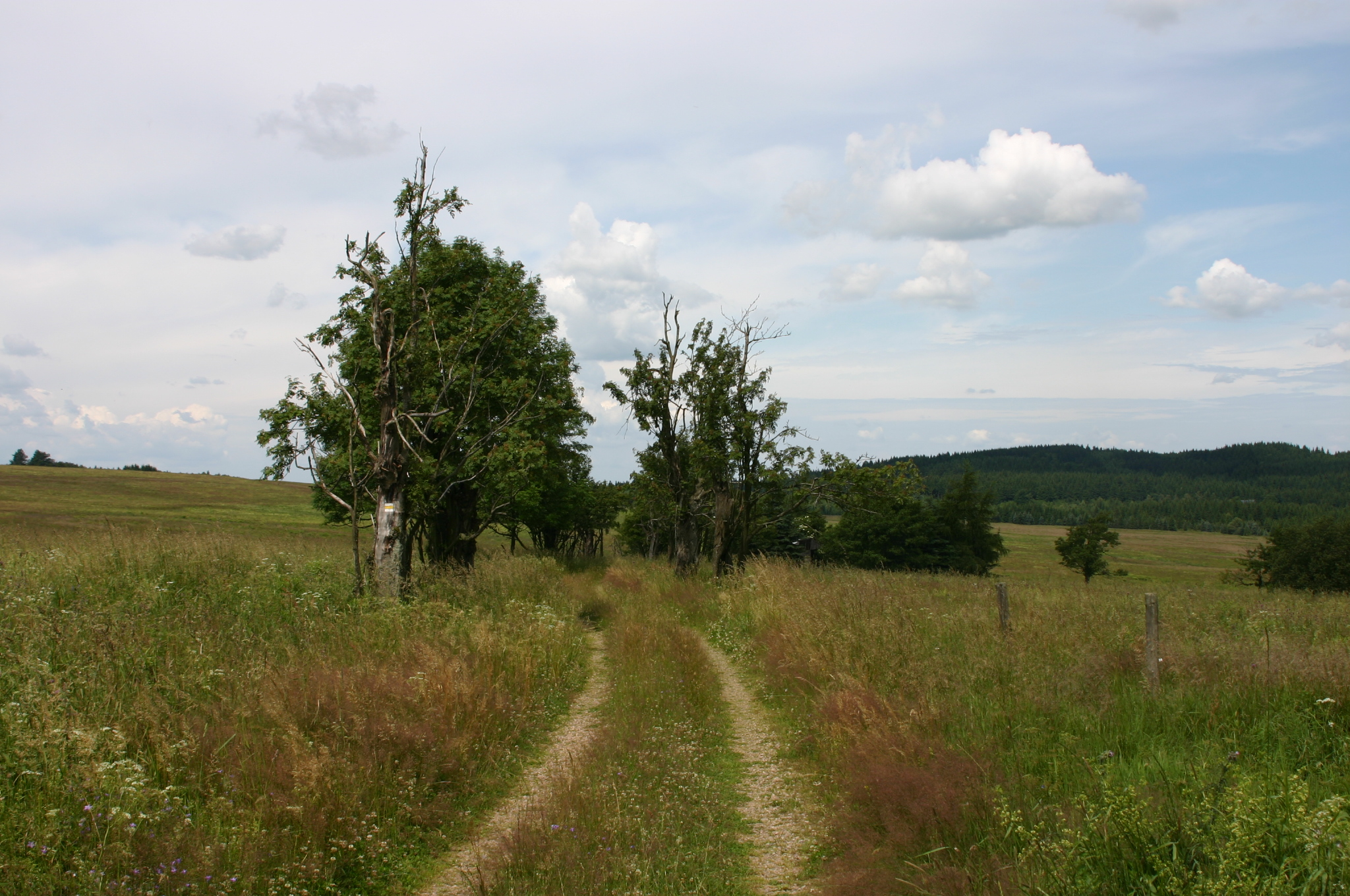
- Steinkuppe (back right) viewed from Pastviny (Czechia)

Highest point
- Elevation: 805.7 m (2,643 ft)

Geography
- Location within Saxony
- Location: Saxony, Germany

Steinkuppe is a mountain of Saxony, southeastern Germany.
