= Scheibenberg (Ore Mountains) =

German Mountain

Coordinates: 50°32′14″N 12°55′26″E

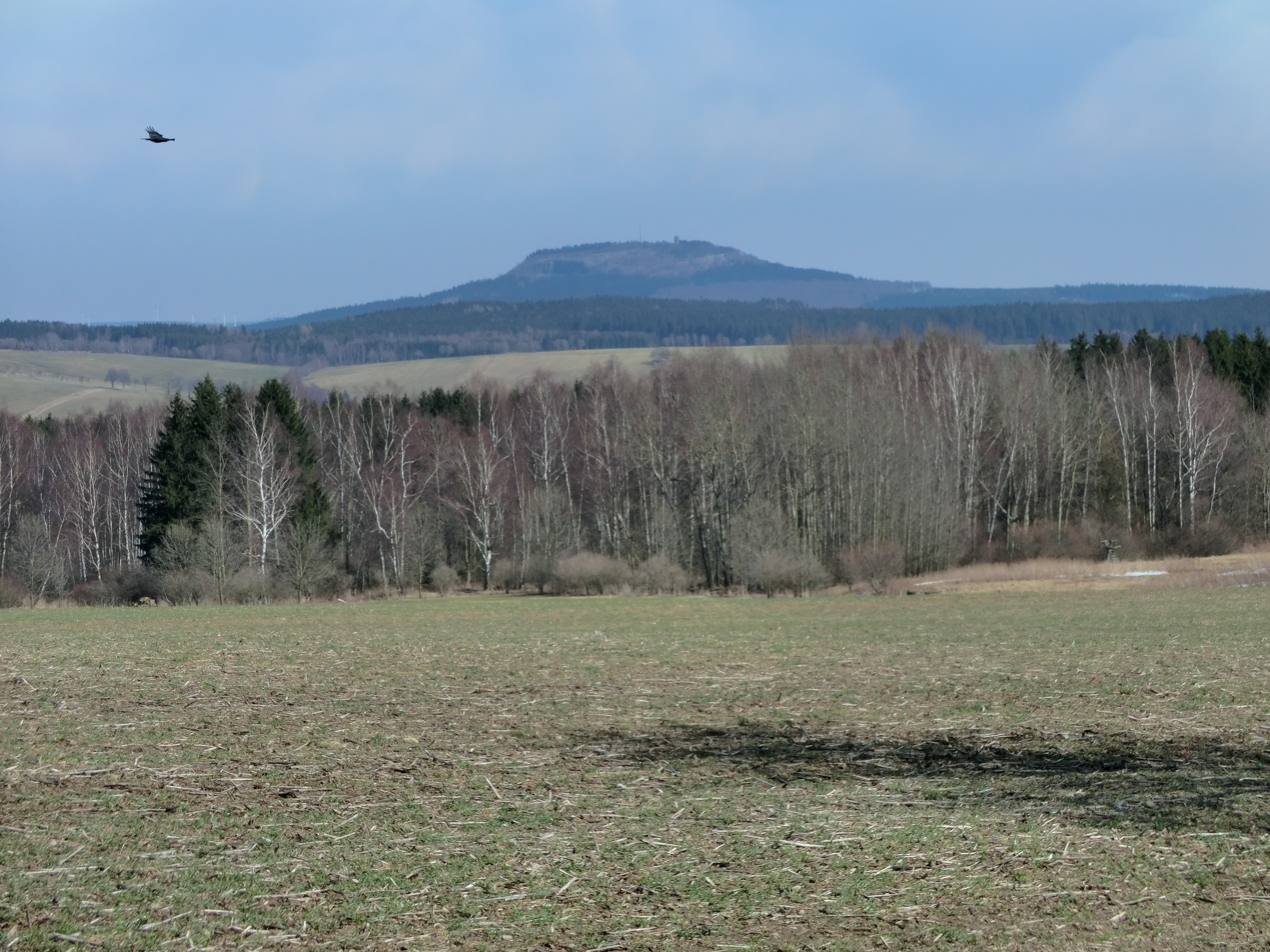

Highest point
- Elevation: 807 m (2,648 ft)

Geography
- Location: Saxony, Germany

Scheibenberg is a mountain of Saxony, southeastern Germany.
