= Geiersberg (Ore Mountains) =

Mountain in Germany

Coordinates: 50°45′05″N 12°56′41″E

Highest point
- Elevation: 536 m (1,759 ft)

Geography
- Location: Saxony, Germany

Geiersberg is a mountain of Saxony, southeastern Germany.
