= Großer Berg (Eastern Upper Lusatia) =

Mountain in Germany

Coordinates: 50°58′33″N 14°47′58″E

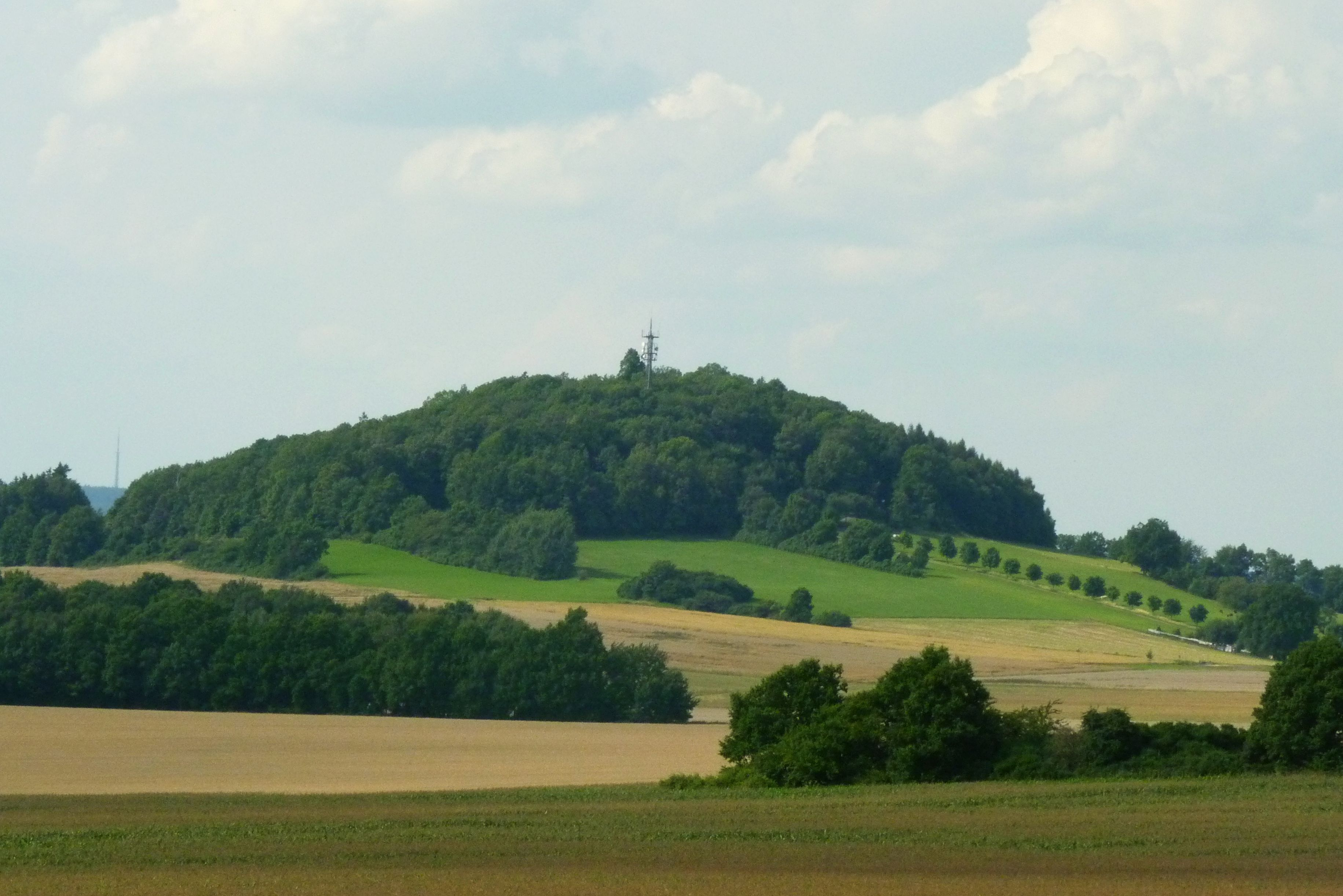
- Großer Berg as seen from Schanzberg

Highest point
- Elevation: 438.1 m (1,437 ft)

Geography
- Location: Saxony, Germany

Großer Berg is a mountain of Saxony, southeastern Germany.
