= Augustusberg (hill) =

Hill in Saxony, Germany

Coordinates: 50°50′36″N 13°57′25″E

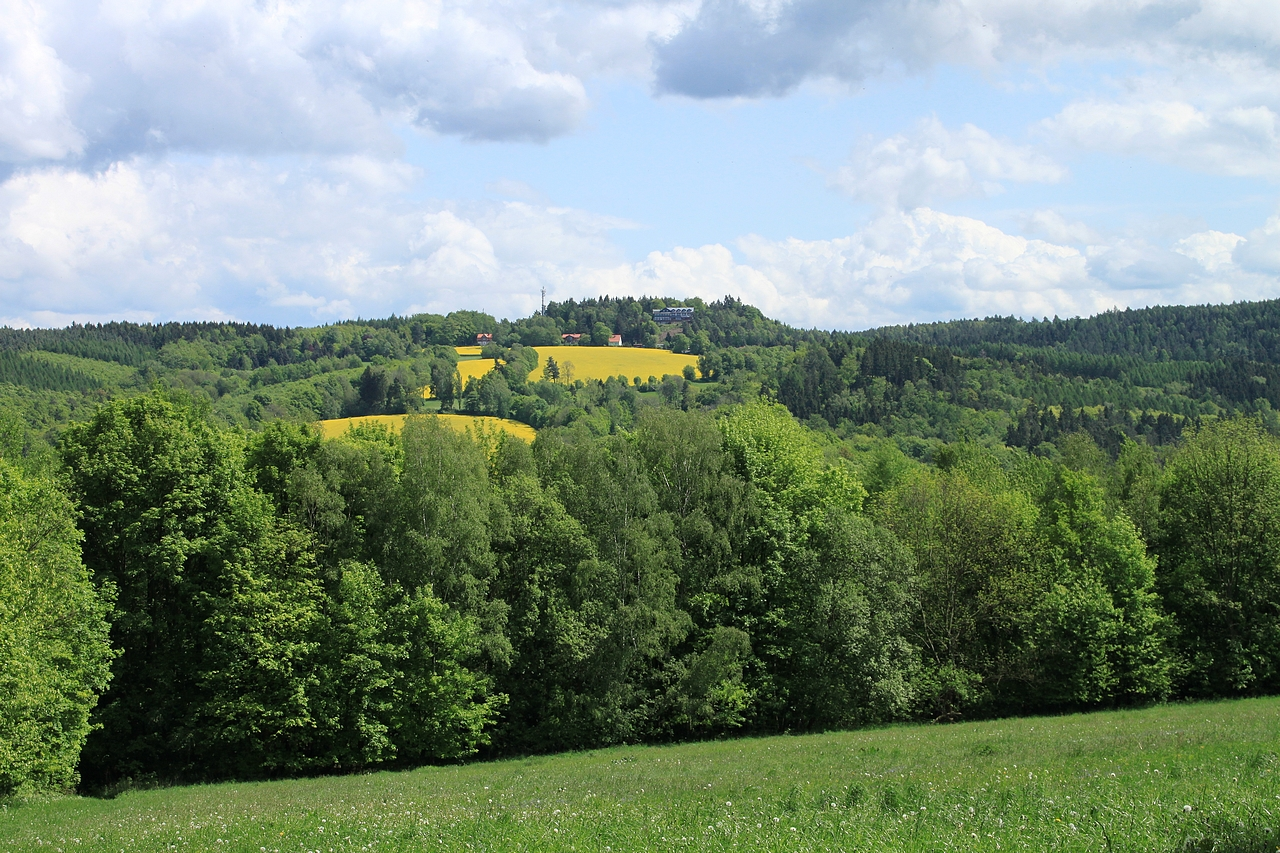
- Western view of the Augustusberg

Highest point
- Elevation: 507 m (1,663 ft)

Geography
- Location: Saxony, Germany
- Parent range: Ore Mountains

Geology
- Rock type: Sandstone

The Augustusberg is a 507 m above sea level (NHN) hill in the Eastern Ore Mountains of southeatern Germany. It rises east of Bad Gottleuba, approximately 150 meters above the Gottleuba valley .

The Augustusberg is primarily composed of granites (tourmaline granite from Gottleuba, Markersbach biotite granite) and gneisses. These two Erzgebirge bedrocks are covered by Cretaceous deposits. The summit of the mountain consists of grey, iron-rich sandstone (Labiatus blocks).

== Paths to the summit ==
The summit can be reached via a short side road from State Road 173 Pirna – State Border (Petrovice u Chabařovic) (formerly the New Dresden-Teplitz Post Road). Several hiking trails also lead to Augustusberg. The Eisenach–Budapest mountain trail also passes over the summit.

== Mountain hotel and former observation tower ==
The predecessor of today's mountain hotel was a simple log cabin built in 1880 as a "mountain restaurant." At the same time, the Mountain Association for Saxon-Bohemian Switzerland erected a 10-meter-high wooden observation tower, which collapsed in 1891 due to storm damage. In 1893, the town of Gottleuba built a new tower, again made of wood, but with a stone base. This tower had to be dismantled after the Second World War due to its dilapidated condition and was never replaced.

== Outlook ==
Augustusberg, situated high above the eastern slope of the Gottleuba valley, provides panoramic views towards the Elbe valley and the Eastern Ore Mountains. In good conditions, the view extends into the Elbe valley as far as the Dresden TV tower, and towards the Eastern Ore Mountains across the Gottleuba reservoir to the Geisingberg, Kahleberg, and the Frauenstein castle ruins.

== Monuments ==
At the summit stands a memorial stone erected in 1963 to commemorate the 150th anniversary of the battles fought during the Wars of Liberation. The transformer station at the junction of the road to Augustusberg has borne a corresponding inscription since 1913. In August and September 1813, several heavy engagements took place in the area between Berggießhübel and Hellendorf in connection with the Battle of Kulm.
