= Schlechteberg =

Mountain in Saxony, Germany

Coordinates: 50°59′55″N 14°35′22″E

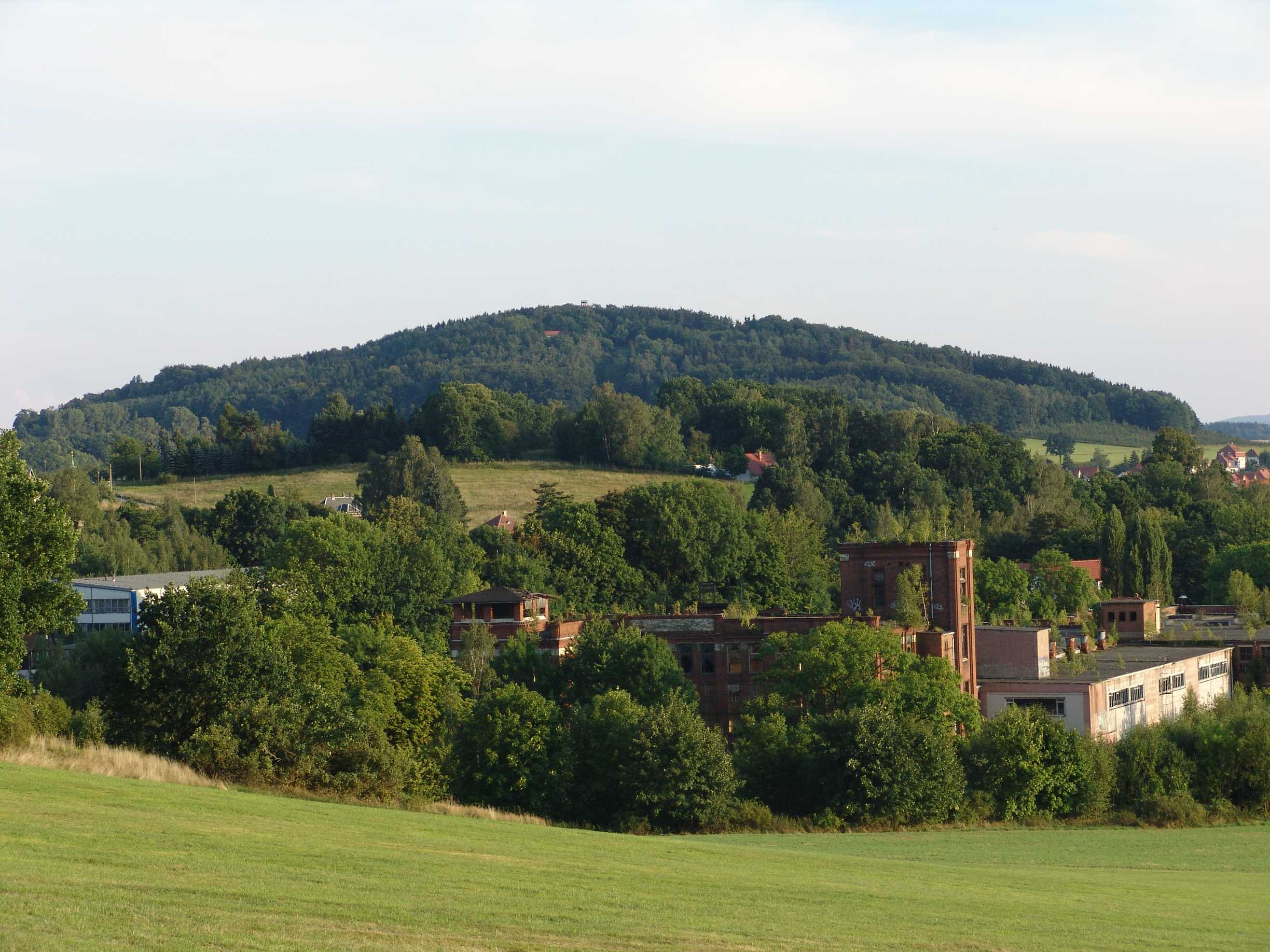
- Schlechteberg viewed from the west.

Highest point
- Elevation: 485.4 m (1,593 ft)

Geography
- Location within Germany Location within Saxony
- Location: Saxony, Germany

Schlechteberg (Upper Sorbian: Šlechtebórk) is a mountain of Saxony, southeastern Germany.
