= Gohlig =

Coordinates: 50°58′58″N 13°43′09″E

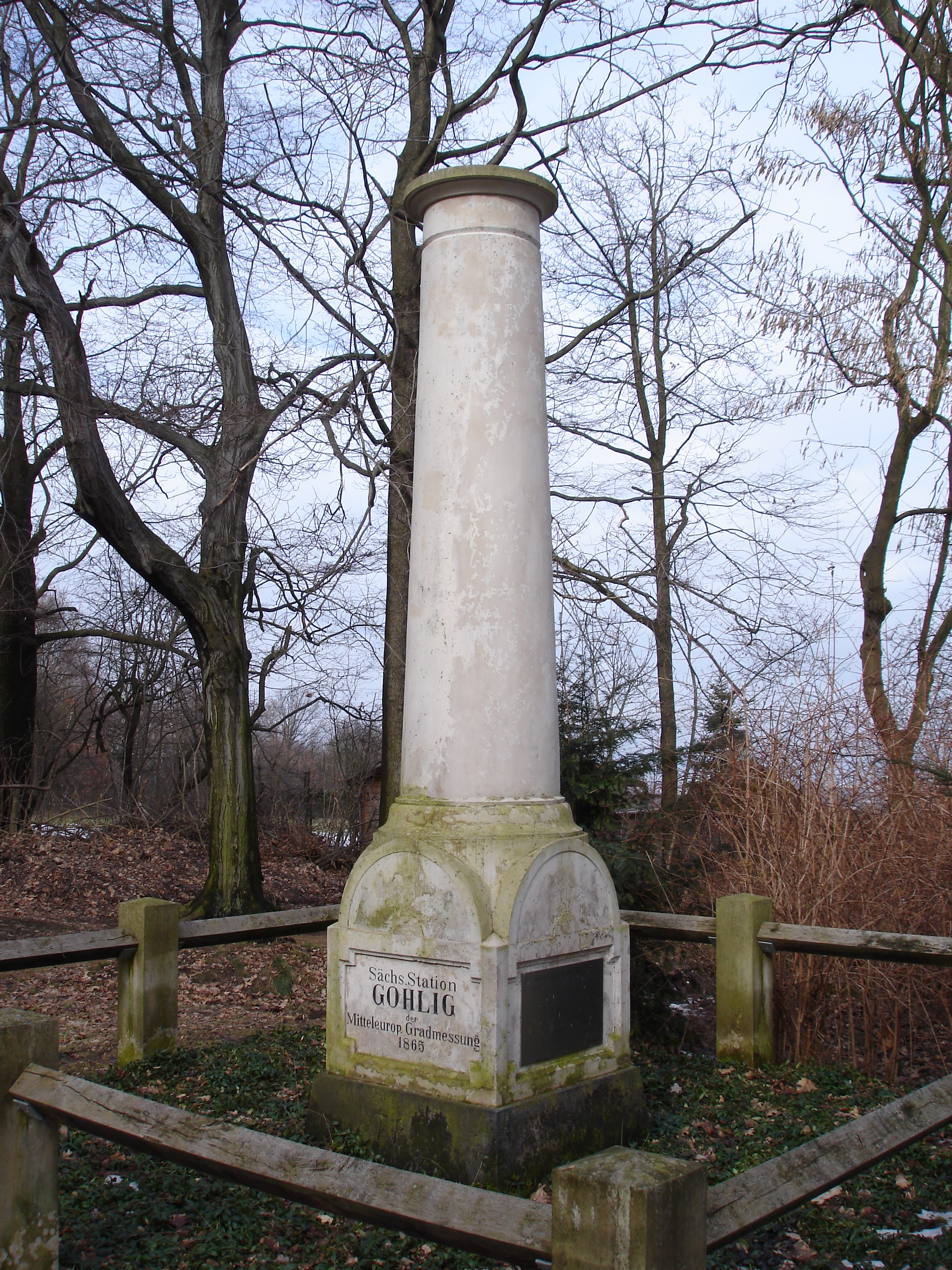
- Measurement point of the Central European degree measurement on the Gohlig

Highest point
- Elevation: 345.4 m (1,133 ft)

Geography
- Location: Saxony, Germany

Gohlig is a mountain of Saxony, southeastern Germany.
