= Drachenkopf (Nassau) =

Mountain in Germany

Coordinates: 50°44′41″N 13°35′56″E

Drachenkopf bei Nassau

Highest point
- Elevation: 805 m (2,641 ft)

Geography
- Location: Saxony, Germany

Drachenkopf bei Nassau is a mountain of Saxony, southeastern Germany.
