= Weifaer Höhe =

Mountain in Saxony, Germany

Coordinates: 51°05′N 14°22′E

Highest point
- Elevation: 504 m (1,654 ft)

Geography
- Location: Saxony, Germany

Weifaer Höhe

Weifaer Höhe (Upper Sorbian: Wějfar Wóža) is a mountain of Saxony, southeastern Germany.
