= Hundsmarter =

Mountain in Saxony, Germany

Coordinates: 50°30′30″N 12°52′10″E

Highest point
- Elevation: 848 m (2,782 ft)

Geography
- Location: Saxony, Germany

Hundsmarter is a mountain of Saxony, southeastern Germany.
