= Udohöhe =

Coordinates: 50°53′N 13°10′E

Highest point
- Elevation: 496 m (1,627 ft)

Geography
- Location: Saxony, Germany

Udohöhe is a mountain of Saxony, southeastern Germany.
