= Sauberg =

Mountain in Germany

Coordinates: 50°27′28″N 12°46′08″E

Highest point
- Elevation: 797 m (2,615 ft)

Geography
- Location: Saxony, Germany

Sauberg is a mountain of Saxony, southeastern Germany.
