= Wäschberg =

Mountain in Germany

Coordinates: 50°56′45″N 13°12′57″E

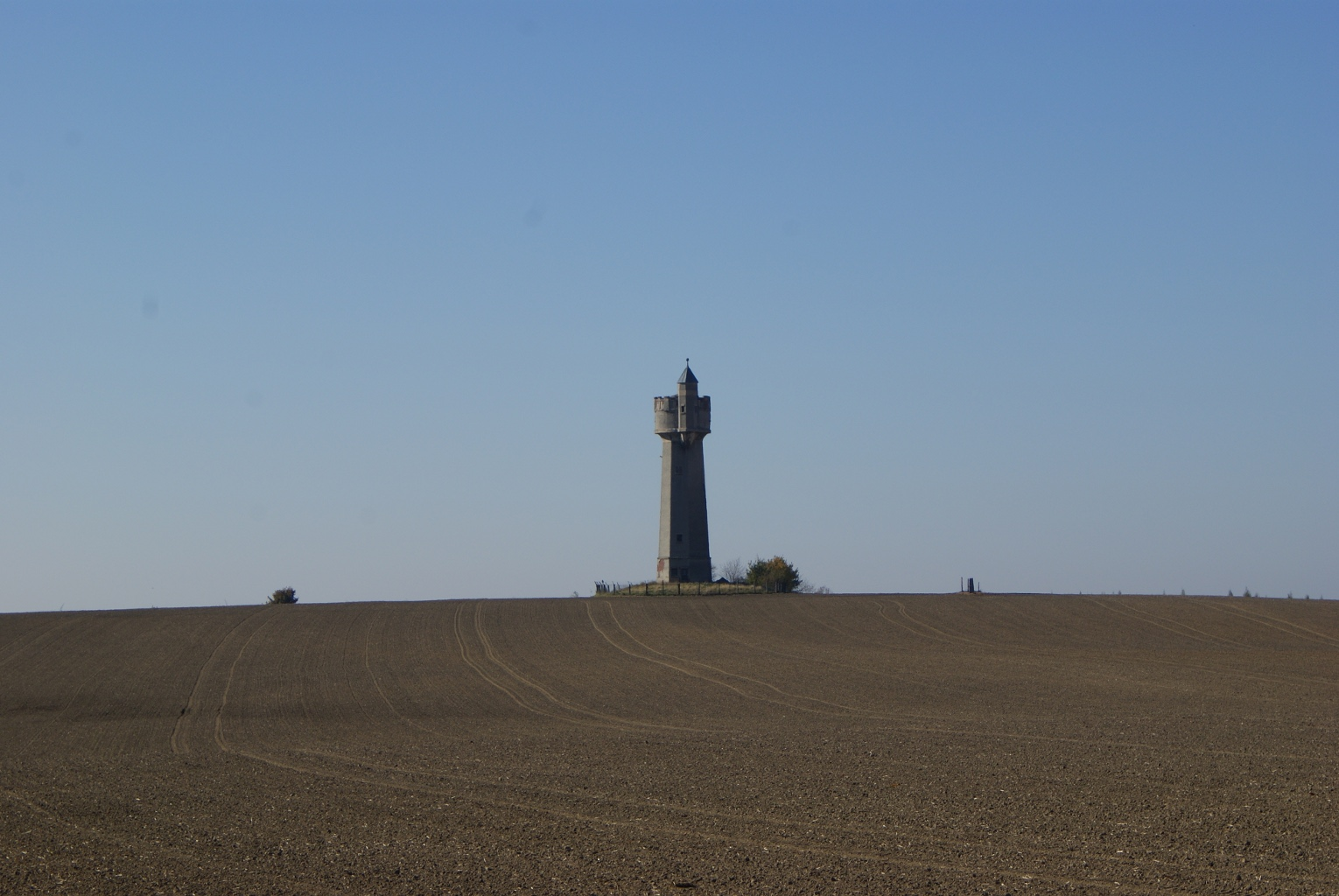
- Bräunsdorf water tower on the Waschberg.

Highest point
- Elevation: 401.7 m (1,318 ft)

Geography
- Location: Saxony, Germany

Wäschberg is a mountain of Saxony, southeastern Germany. The Wäschberg is a 401.7-metre-high mountain in the Lower Eastern Ore Mountains northwest of Bräunsdorf in the district of Mittelsachsen in Saxony, Germany.

The mountain consists mainly of mica schist, in its foothills it turns into biotite gneiss in a south-easterly direction and greywacke in a north-westerly direction and thus represents a part of the edge of the Ore Mountains towards the Saxon loess hills.

The Wäschberg is located in the catchment area of the Große Striegis and is mainly used for agriculture, only on the steeply inclined to steep, western slope facing the Striegistale is it used for forestry. At the top of the mountain there is a trigonometric measuring point and the Bräunsdorf water tower.
