= Schwedenstein (hill) =

Mountain in Germany

Coordinates: 51°11′34″N 14°03′23″E

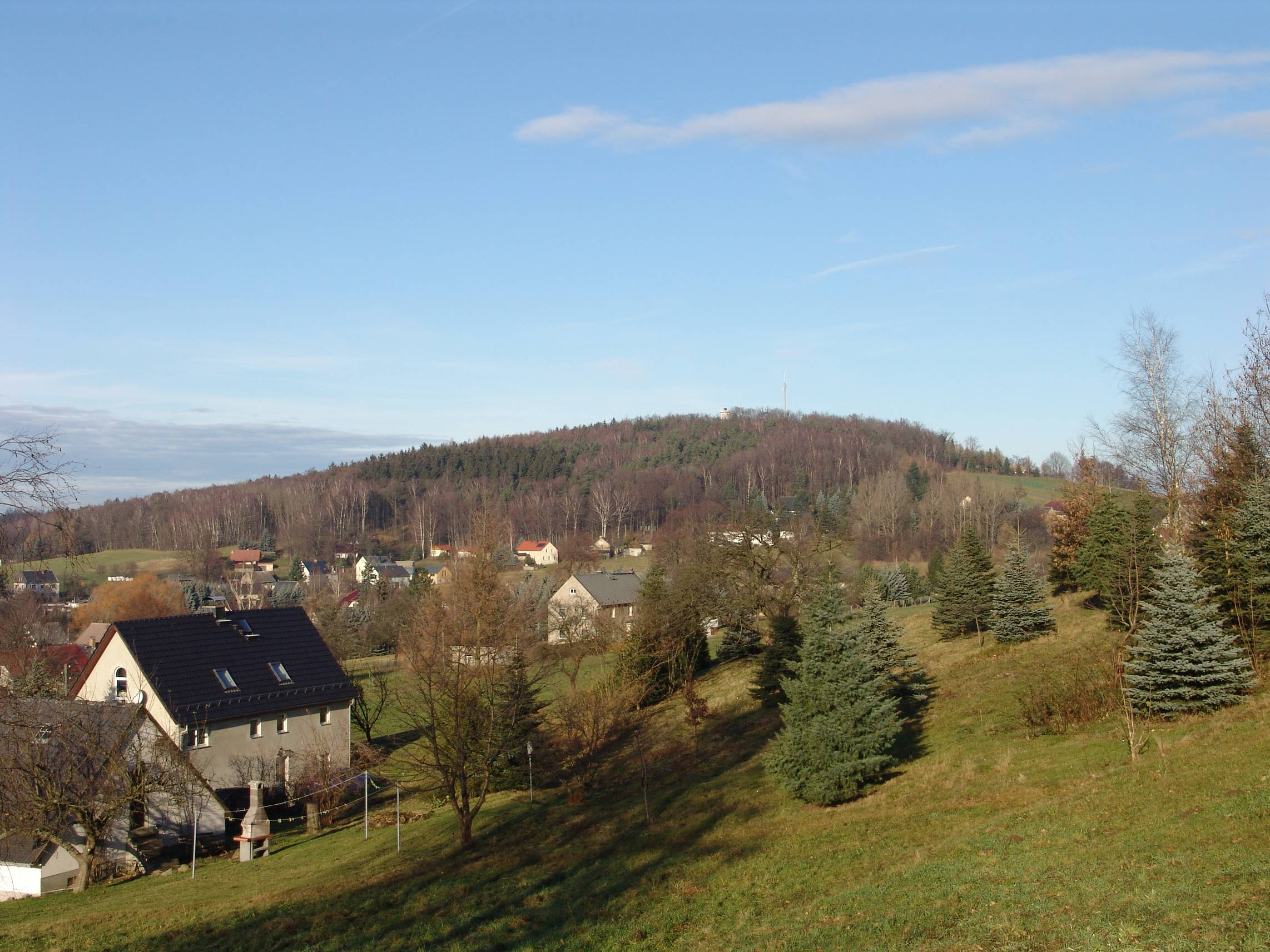

Highest point
- Elevation: 420 m (1,380 ft)

Geography
- Location: Saxony, Germany

Schwedenstein is a mountain of Saxony, southeastern Germany.
