= Lampertsstein =

Mountain in Saxony, Germany

Coordinates: 50°52′24″N 14°04′20″E

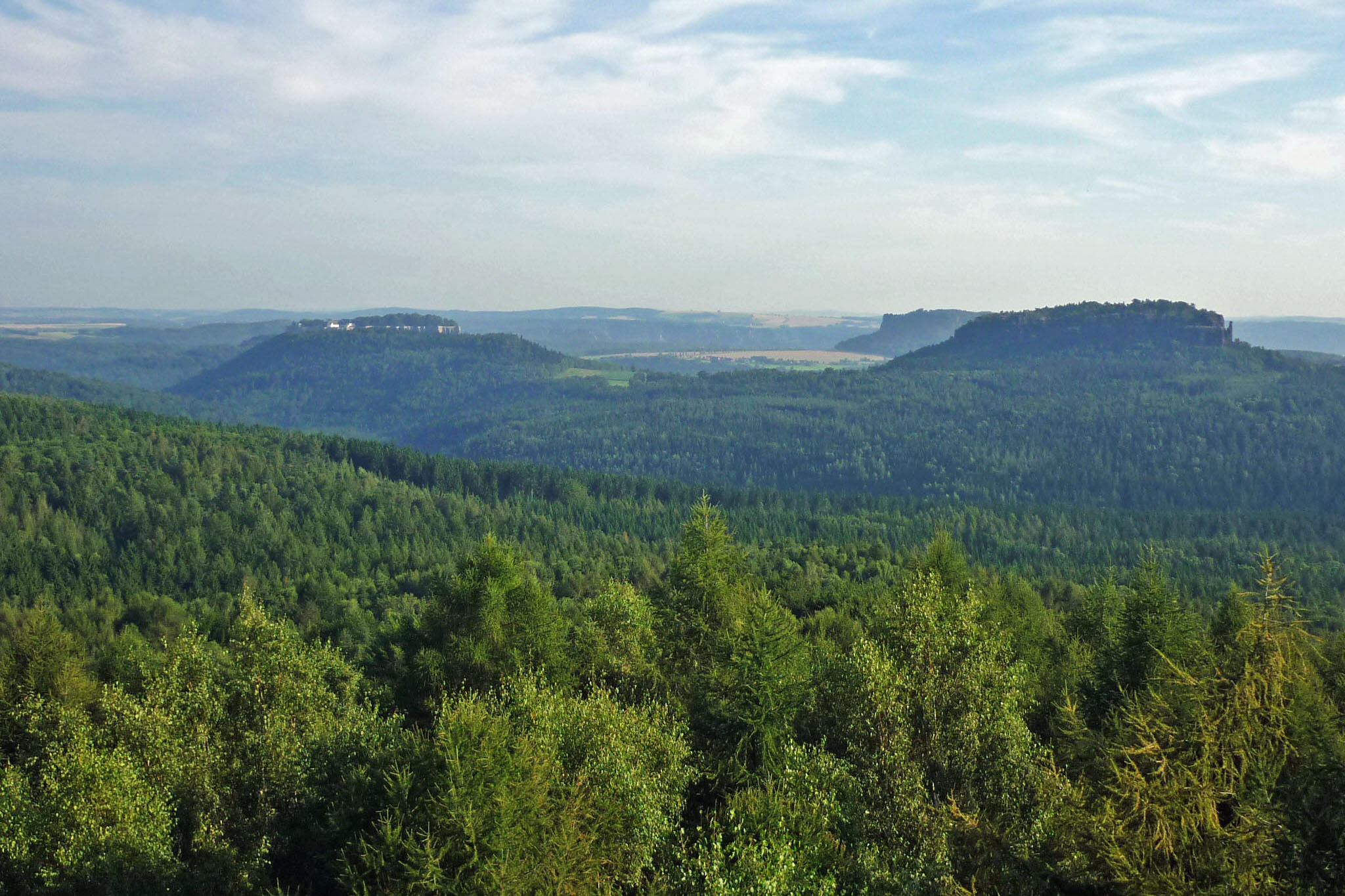

Geography
- Location: Saxony, Germany

Lampertsstein is a mountain of Saxony, southeastern Germany.
