= Gemauerter Stein =

Coordinates: 50°35′N 12°41′E

Highest point
- Elevation: 601 m (1,972 ft)

Geography
- Location: Saxony, Germany

Gemauerter Stein is a mountain of Saxony, southeastern Germany.
