= Monumentberg =

Mountain in Germany

Coordinates: 51°15′24″N 14°42′16″E

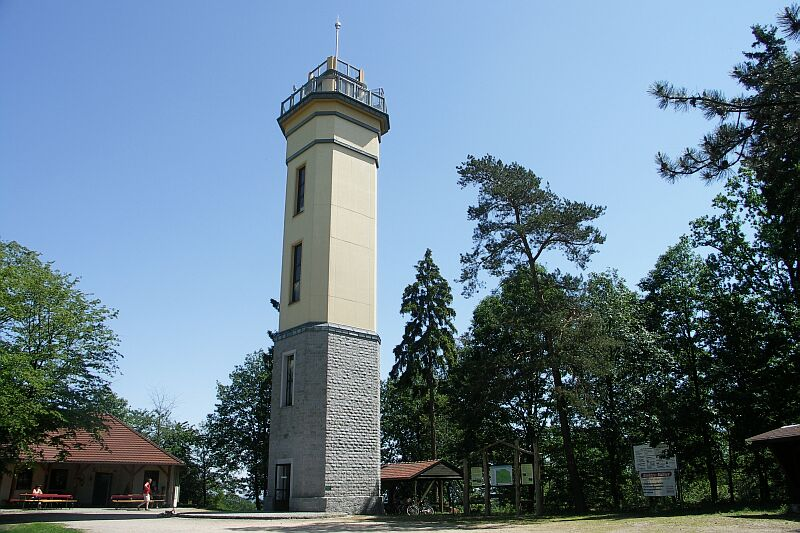
- Monumentberg

Highest point
- Elevation: 293.4 m (963 ft)

Geography
- Location: Saxony, Germany

Monumentberg is a mountain of Saxony, southeastern Germany.
