= Rehhübel =

Mountain in Germany

Coordinates: 50°26′N 12°22′E

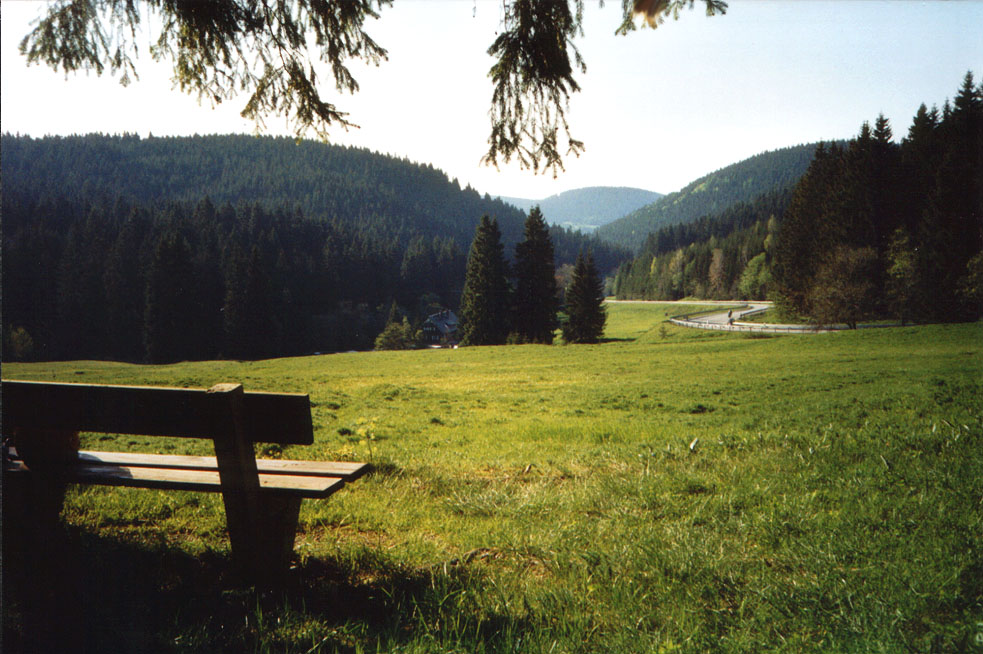
- View from Rehhübel.

Highest point
- Elevation: 932 m (3,058 ft)

Geography
- Location: Saxony, Germany

Rehhübel is a mountain of Saxony, southeastern Germany. The Rehhübel lies in the western Ore Mountains near Oberwildenthal and south of the Sauschwemme, a district of Johanngeorgenstadt in the Erzgebirge district. The next highest elevation not far from the Rehhübel is the Auersberg, located about three kilometers to the north and at 1,018.2 meters above sea level. The border with the Czech Republic runs just a few hundred meters south of the Rehhübel.
