= Beckenberg =

Mountain in Germany

Coordinates: 50°58′58″N 14°40′18″E

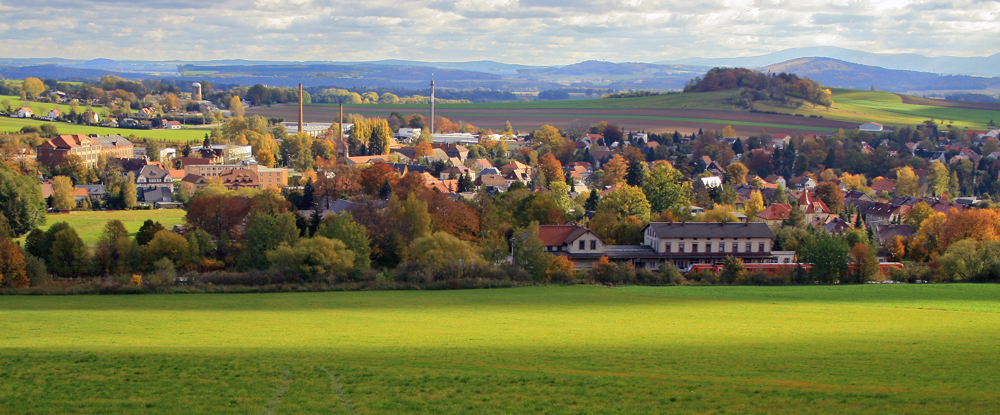
- Egg building with Beckenberg in the background.

Highest point
- Elevation: 407.6 m (1,337 ft)

Geography
- Location: Saxony, Germany

Beckenberg is a mountain of Saxony, southeastern Germany. The summit stands at 408.8 metres above sea level (NN), and the landform is marked by steep gradients on three sides. The name of the hill is likely derived from its isolated geographical position, standing approximately 50 metres above the floor of the Eibau basin (Eibauer Talbecken) of the Landwasser valley to the south. To the southeast, several lower knolls composed of nephelinite basanite are aligned and separated from one another by narrow saddles.
