= Oßlinger Berg =

Mountain in Germany

Coordinates: 51°21′27″N 14°09′02″E

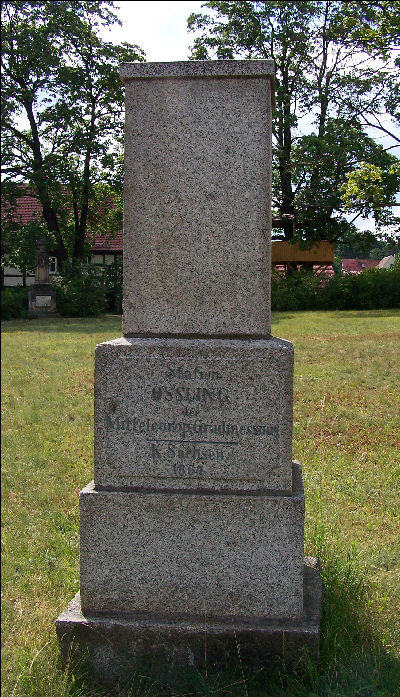
- Survey pillar from Oßlinger Berg

Geography
- Location: Saxony, Germany

Oßlinger Berg is a mountain of Saxony, southeastern Germany.

The mountain is featured in a Wendish folktale about a family of giants who were responsible for the creation of the nearby Dubringer Berg.

The mountain previously held a first order pillar of the Royal Saxon Triangulation system, a major land survey which took place from 1862 – 1890 in the Kingdom of Saxony.
