= Steinberg (Wittgendorf) =

Coordinates: 50°57′20″N 14°50′31″E

Highest point
- Elevation: 408.6 m (1,341 ft)

Geography
- Location: Saxony, Germany

Steinberg (German pronunciation: [ˈʃtaɪ̯nˌbɛʁk]) is a mountain of Saxony, southeastern Germany.
