= Keulenberg =

Mountain in Germany

Coordinates: 51°13′43″N 13°57′28″E

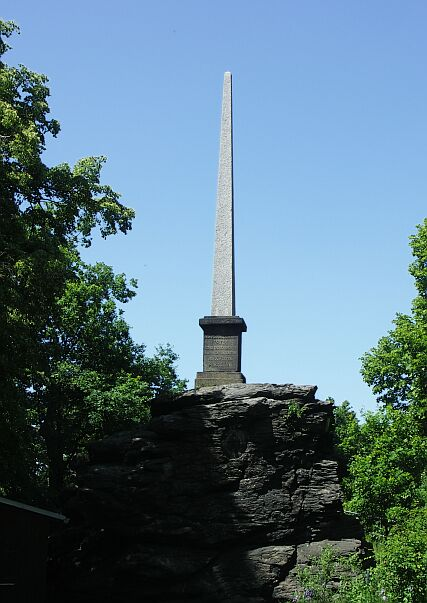
- Top of Keulenberg Mountain, Saxony, Germany

Highest point
- Elevation: 413 m (1,355 ft)

Geography
- Location: Pulsnitz, Saxony, Germany

Keulenberg is a mountain of Saxony, southeastern Germany. It's located near Oberlichtenau, which is part of the small town of Pulsnitz. Its highest elevation is at 1355 feet.
