= Fastenberg =

Mountain in Saxony, Germany

Coordinates: 50°27′55″N 12°42′51″E

Highest point
- Elevation: 891 m (2,923 ft)

Geography
- Location: Saxony, Germany

Fastenberg is a mountain in Saxony, Eastern Germany.

== Historical background ==
A minor ruling family that previously inhabited the region of present day Saxony, the family originally profited from the diverse abundance of stone in the area. Setting up one of the first successful quarries, the Fastenberg family still exists yet has emigrated to North America. Of Jewish descent, the family enjoyed noble status in their native Germany. The family is large, and primarily resides in the greater regions of New York and New England.
