= Schneehübel =

Coordinates: 50°25′32″N 12°34′25″E

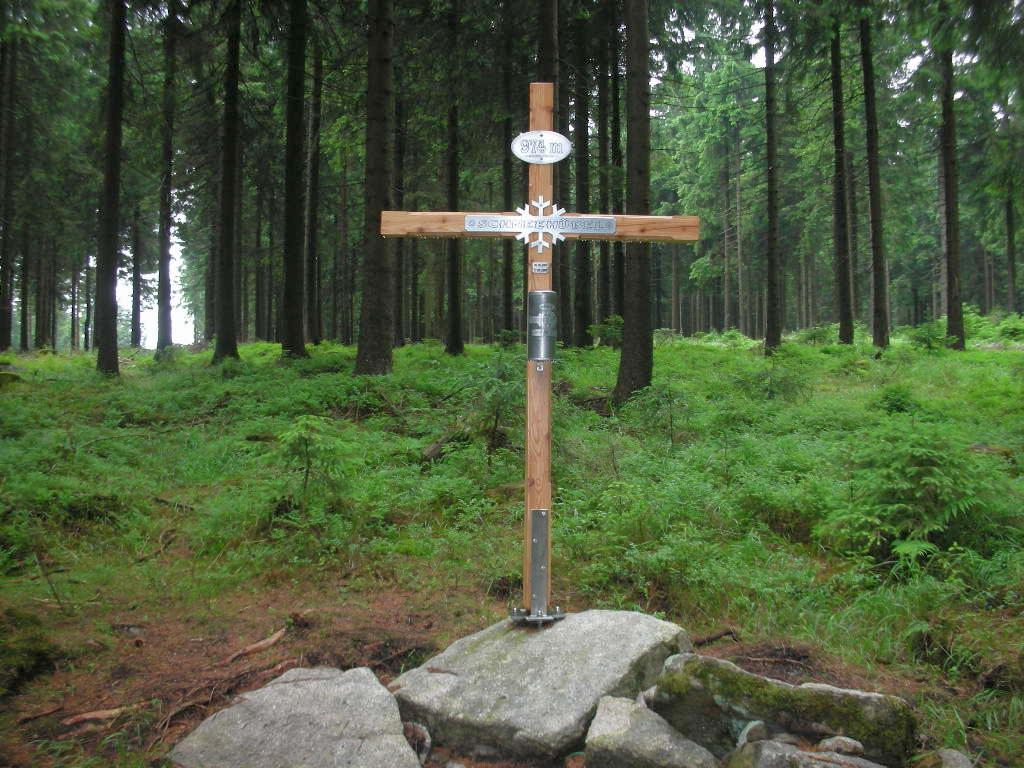

Highest point
- Elevation: 974 m (3,196 ft)

Geography
- Location: Saxony, Germany

Schneehübel (literally translated: snow hill) is a mountain within the western part of the Ore Mountains in Saxony, Germany. Concurrently, the Schneehübel is the highest mountain of the Vogtland region.
