= Thromberg =

Coordinates: 51°08′N 14°27′E

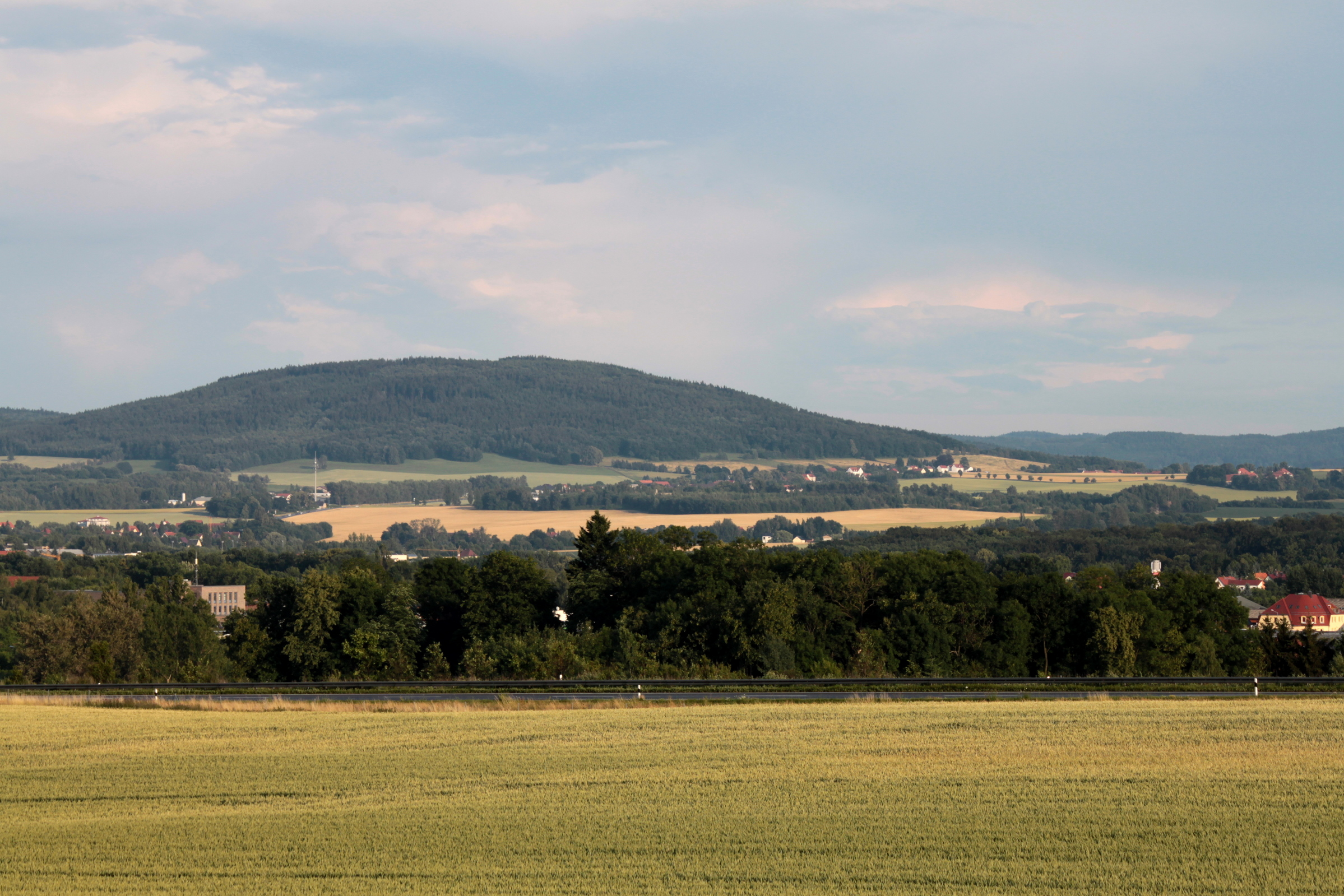
- The Thromberg from Salzenforst.

Highest point
- Elevation: 432 m (1,417 ft)

Geography
- Location: Saxony, Germany

Thromberg (sorbian Lubin) is a mountain of Saxony, southeastern Germany. It is situated six kilometres south-east of Bautzen and part of the Upper Lusatian mountains.
