= Frenzelsberg =

Coordinates: 50°55′54″N 14°34′08″E

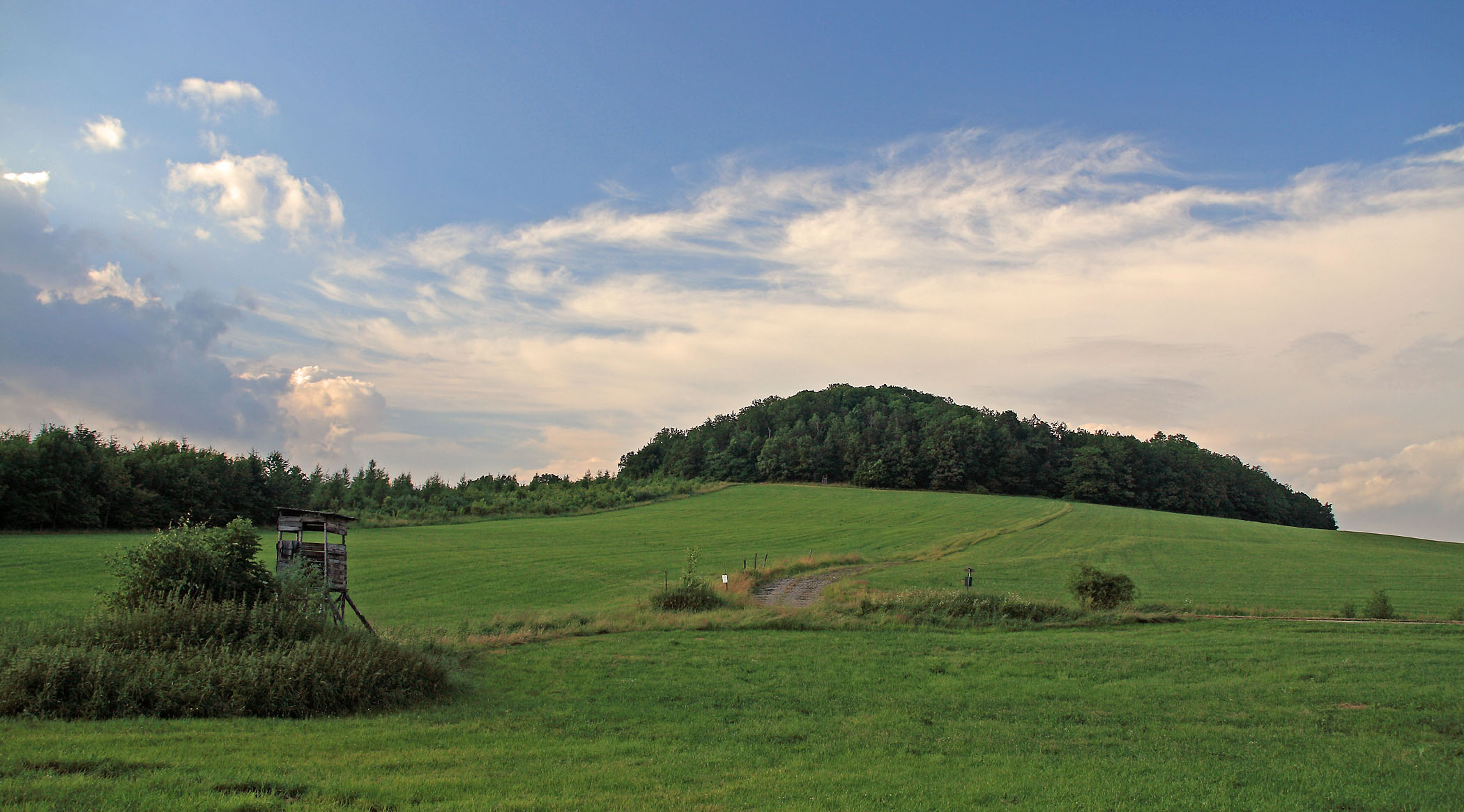

Highest point
- Elevation: 474.3 m (1,556 ft)

Geography
- Location: Saxony, Germany

Frenzelsberg is a mountain of Saxony, southeastern Germany.
