= Heidelsberg =

Coordinates: 50°34′49″N 12°42′20″E

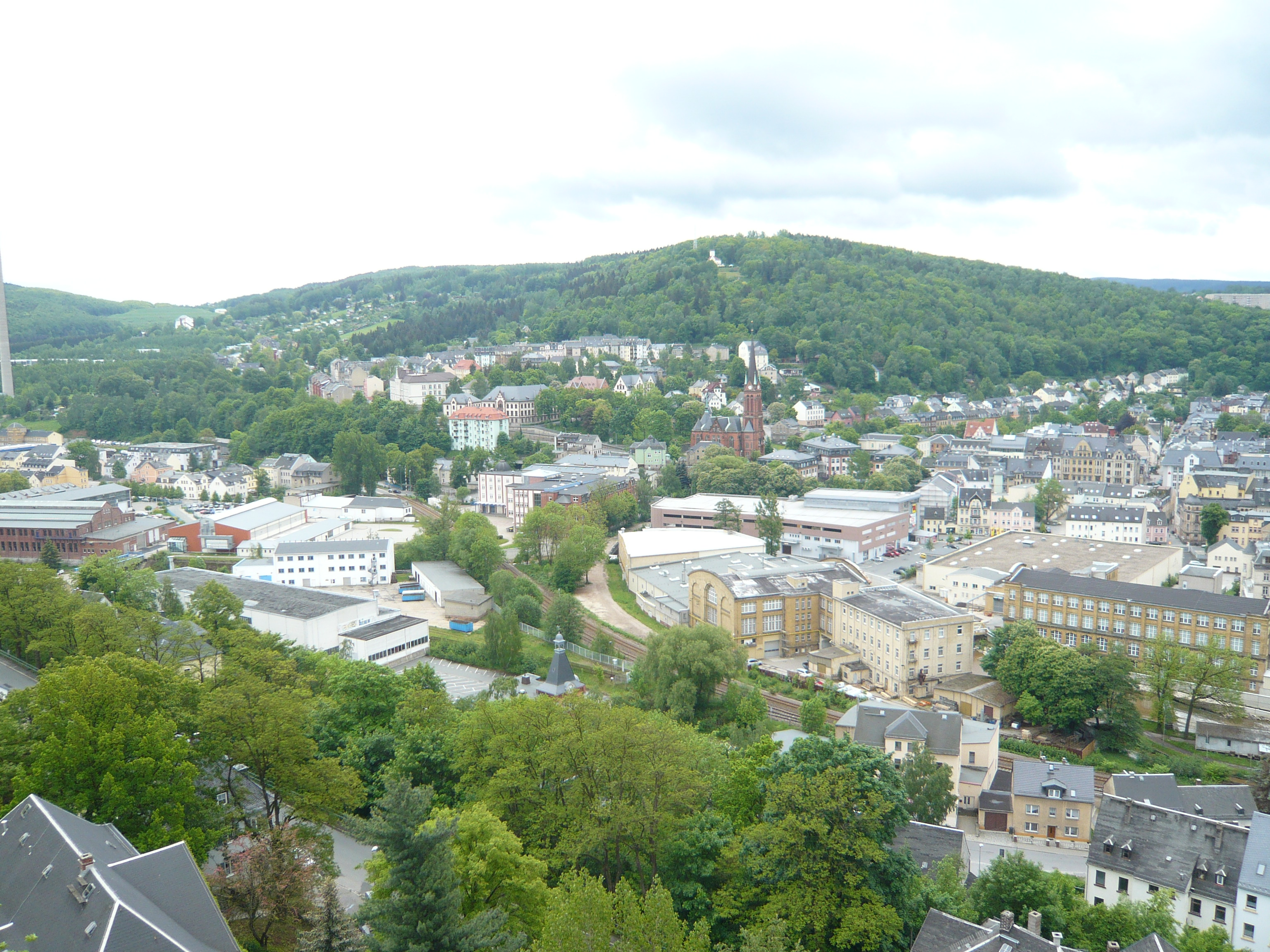
- City of Aue and Heidelsberg mountain

Highest point
- Elevation: 512 m (1,680 ft)

Geography
- Location: Saxony, Germany

Heidelsberg is a mountain of Saxony, southeastern Germany.
