= Buchkamm =

- Location within Saxony

Highest point
- Elevation: 951 m (3,120 ft)
- Coordinates: 50°25′13″N 12°39′30″E

Geography
- Location: Saxony, Germany
- Parent range: Ore Mountains

The Buchkamm, wrongly also called the Buchkamp, is a forested ridge south of Oberwildenthal in the western Saxon Ore Mountains of Germany. Its highest point is 951 metres above sea level and it runs from southwest to northeast, not far from the Czech border. The old Reichsstraße 93 from Leipzig, which makes its way over the Hirschenstander Pass to Karlsbad, runs past the foot of the Buchkamm by the Nasse Bridge. Today it is only used as a forest road. Until the 1990s there was also a royal Saxon milestone here. An old smuggler's path, the Butter Way (Butterweg), runs past the Buchkamm to the southeast. It was used to smuggle butter and other goods between Bohemia and Saxony. It is now a hiking trail.

The Große Bockau rises not far south of the Buchkamm on the Czech border.

In 1839 there was a mine, the Pfingstfest in operation on the Buchkamm.

== Literature ==
- Wander- und Wintersportkarte des Erzgebirges, Blatt 3 - Auersberg, im Auftrag des Sächs. Finanzministeriums herausgegeben vom Reichsamt für Landesaufnahme, 1928.
