= Kemmler =

Mountain in Saxony, Germany

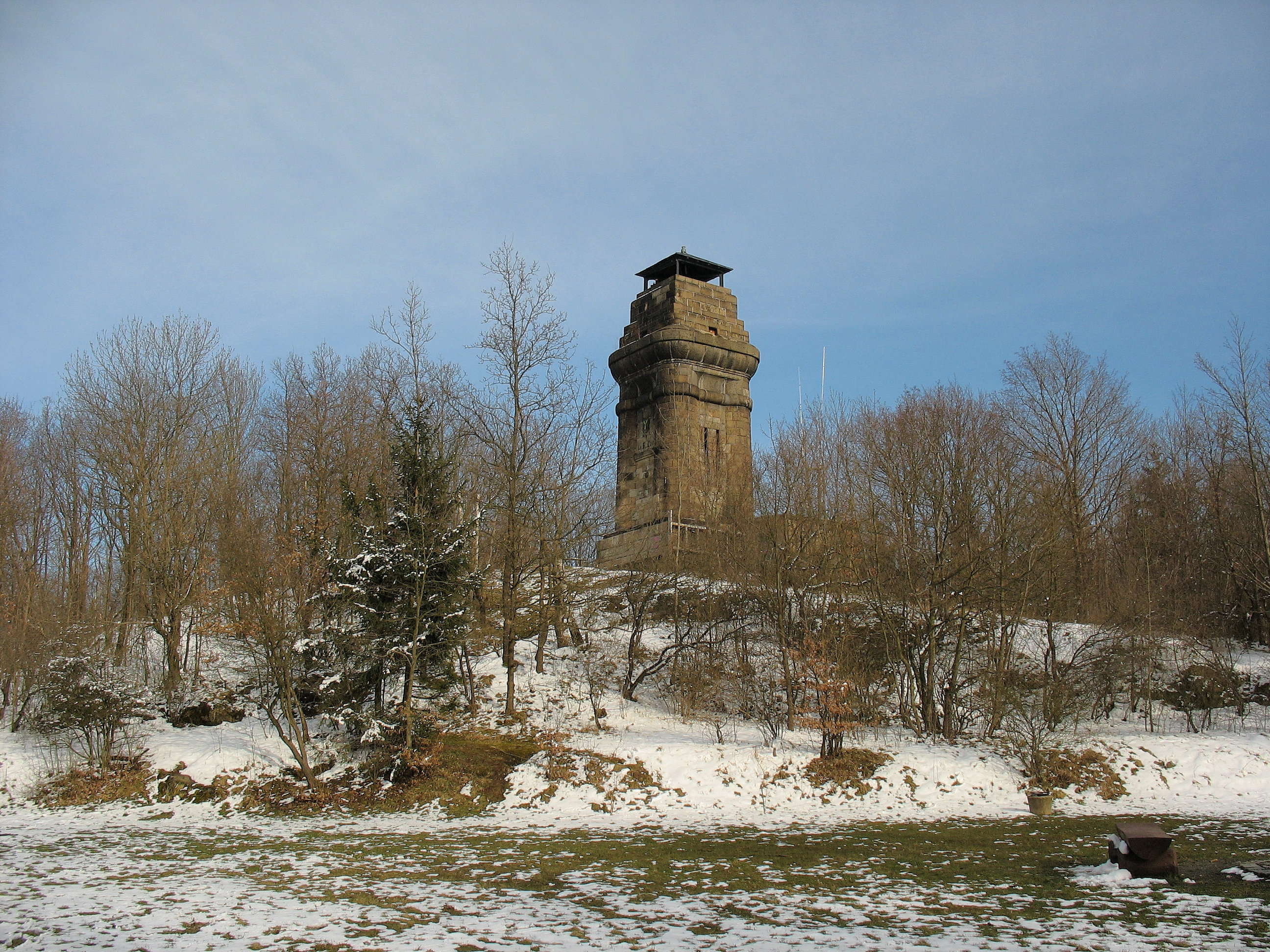
- Bismarck's column on Kemmler summit

Highest point
- Elevation: 507 m (1,663 ft)
- Coordinates: 50°29′N 12°10′E

Geography
- Location: Saxony, Germany

Kemmler is a mountain of Saxony, southeastern Germany. It is situated near Gartenbahn and the peak Galgen-Berg.
