= Hirschknochen =

Mountain in southeastern Germany

Coordinates: 50°30′N 12°40′E

Highest point
- Elevation: 517 m (1,696 ft)

Geography
- Location: Saxony, Germany

Hirschknochen is a mountain of Saxony, southeastern Germany.
