= Schwarzer Berg (Spessart) =

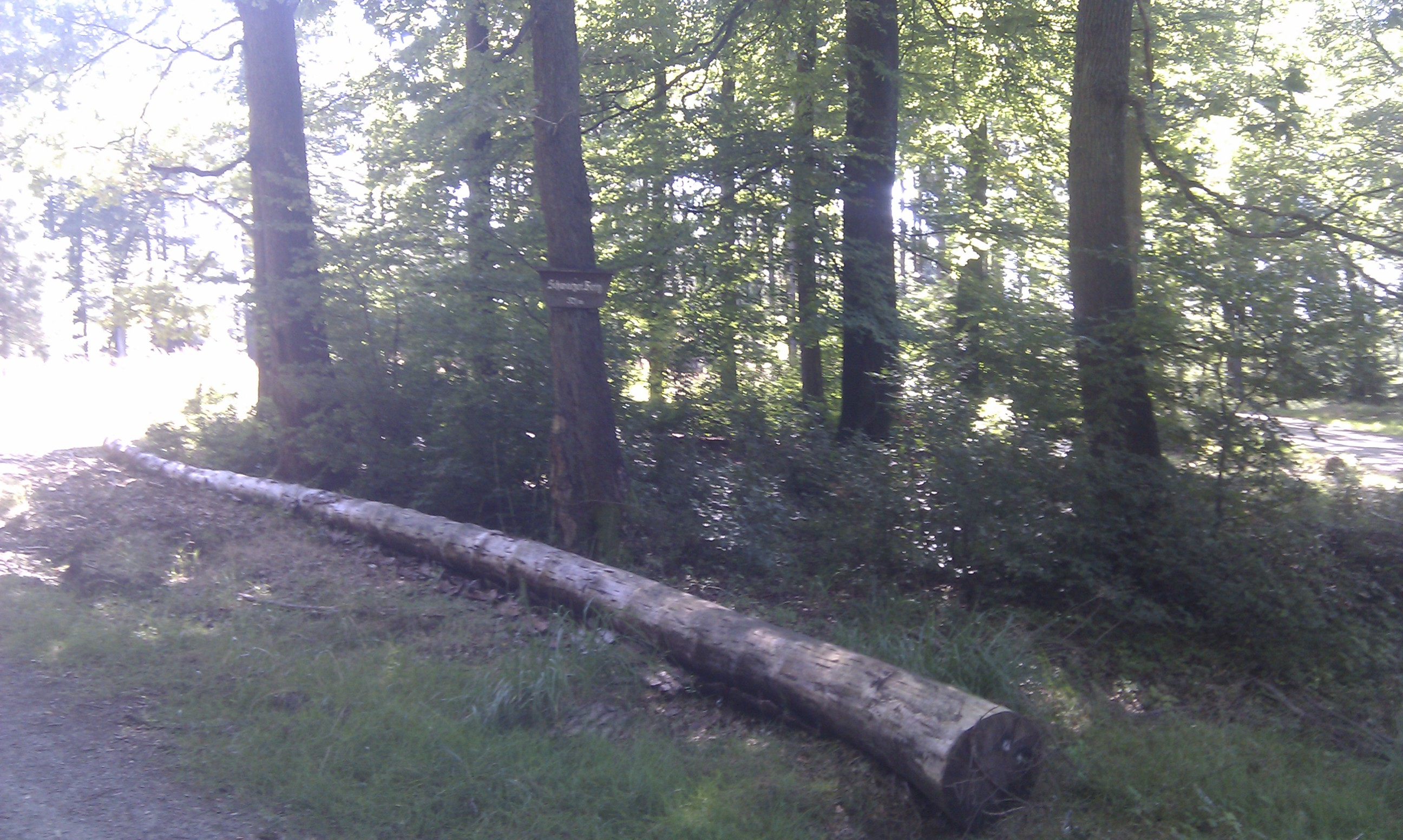
- Black mountain Spessart.

Highest point
- Elevation: 521 m (1,709 ft)
- Coordinates: 50°11′33″N 9°25′49″E

Geography
- Location within Hesse
- Location: Hesse, Germany
- Parent range: Spessart

Schwarzer Berg is a wooded hill located in the Main-Kinzig-Kreis of Hesse, Germany. It is part of the Mittelgebirge Spessart and lies between Bad Orb and Jossgrund.
