= Schwarzer Berg (Jauernick) =

Mountain in Germany

Coordinates: 51°05′39″N 14°53′51″E

Highest point
- Elevation: 393.6 m (1,291 ft)

Geography
- Location: Saxony, Germany

Schwarzer Berg is a mountain of Saxony, southeastern Germany.
