= Großer Picho =

Coordinates: 51°06′32″N 14°21′11″E

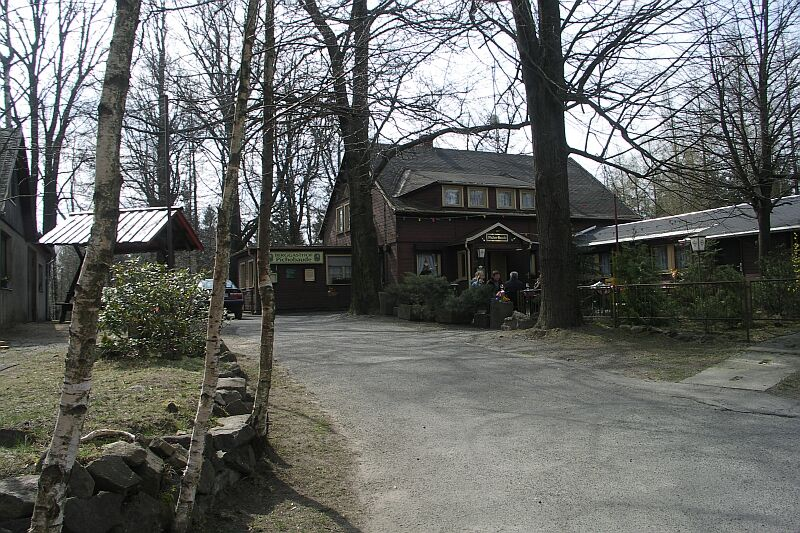

Highest point
- Elevation: 498.6 m (1,636 ft)

Geography
- Location: Saxony, Germany

Großer Picho (Upper Sorbian: Wulki Pichow) is a mountain of Saxony, southeastern Germany.
