= Spiegelwald =

Mountain in Germany

Coordinates: 50°34′39″N 12°47′37″E

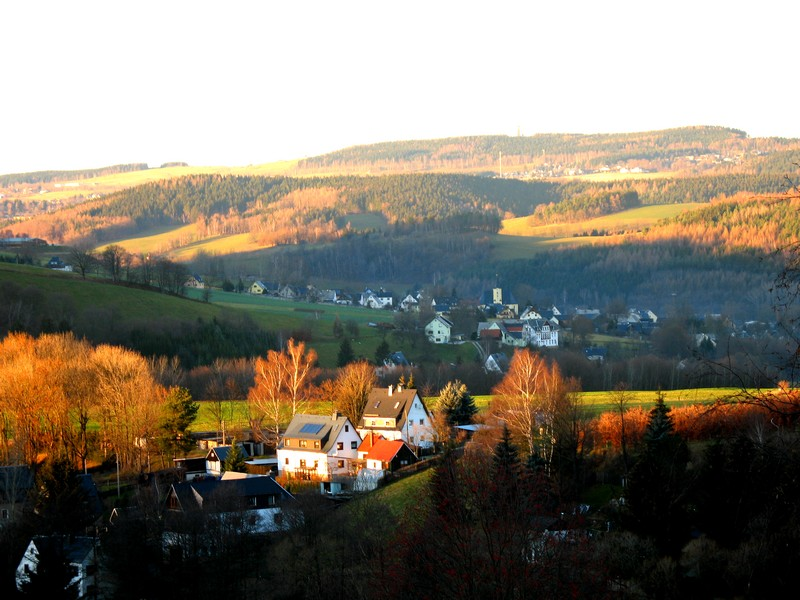
- The Spiegelwald (in the background) from the south with Pöhla and Grünstädtel.

Highest point
- Elevation: 728 m (2,388 ft)

Geography
- Location: Saxony, Germany

Spiegelwald is a mountain of Saxony, southeastern Germany.
