= Ochsenkopf (Jägerhaus) =

Coordinates: 50°30′04″N 12°41′42″E

Ochsenkopf bei Jägerhaus
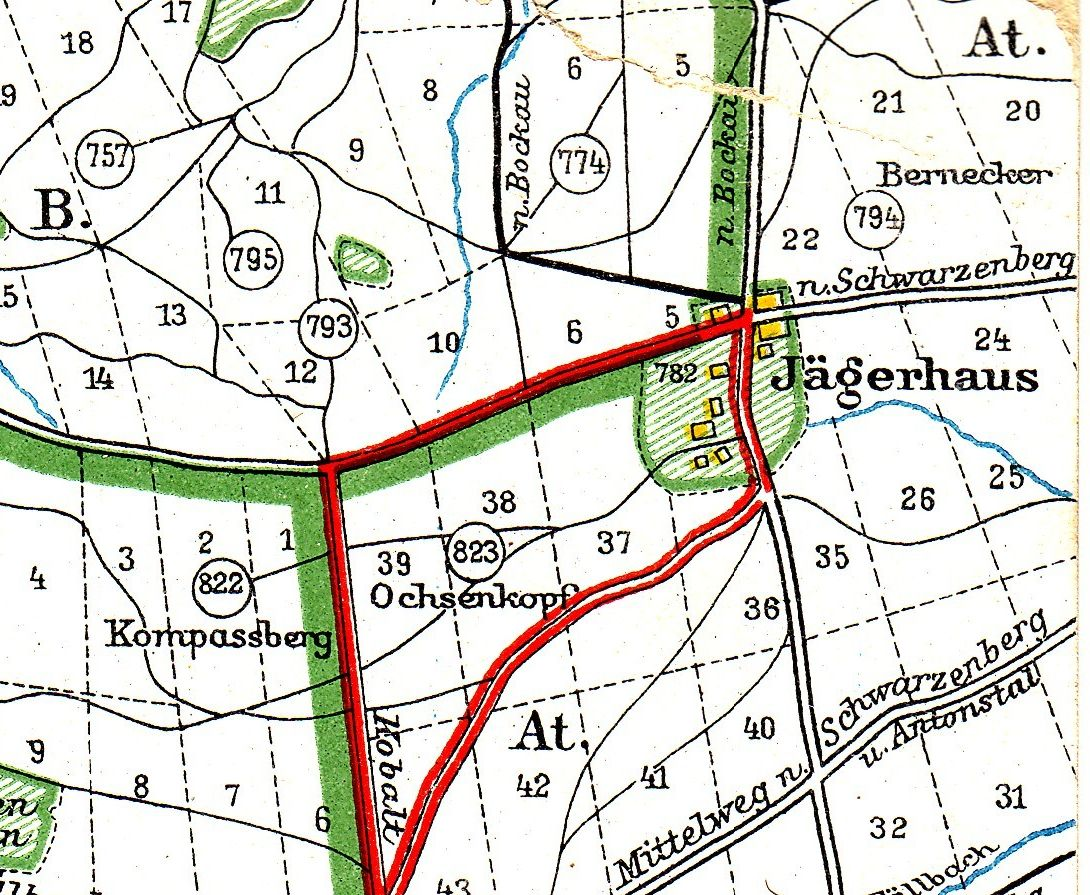
- Map of the Jägerhaus mountain tops showing Ochsenkopf

Highest point
- Elevation: 823 m (2,700 ft)

Geography
- Location: Saxony, Germany

Ochsenkopf bei Jägerhaus is a mountain of Saxony, southeastern Germany.
