= Morgenleithe =

Coordinates: 50°32′N 12°44′E

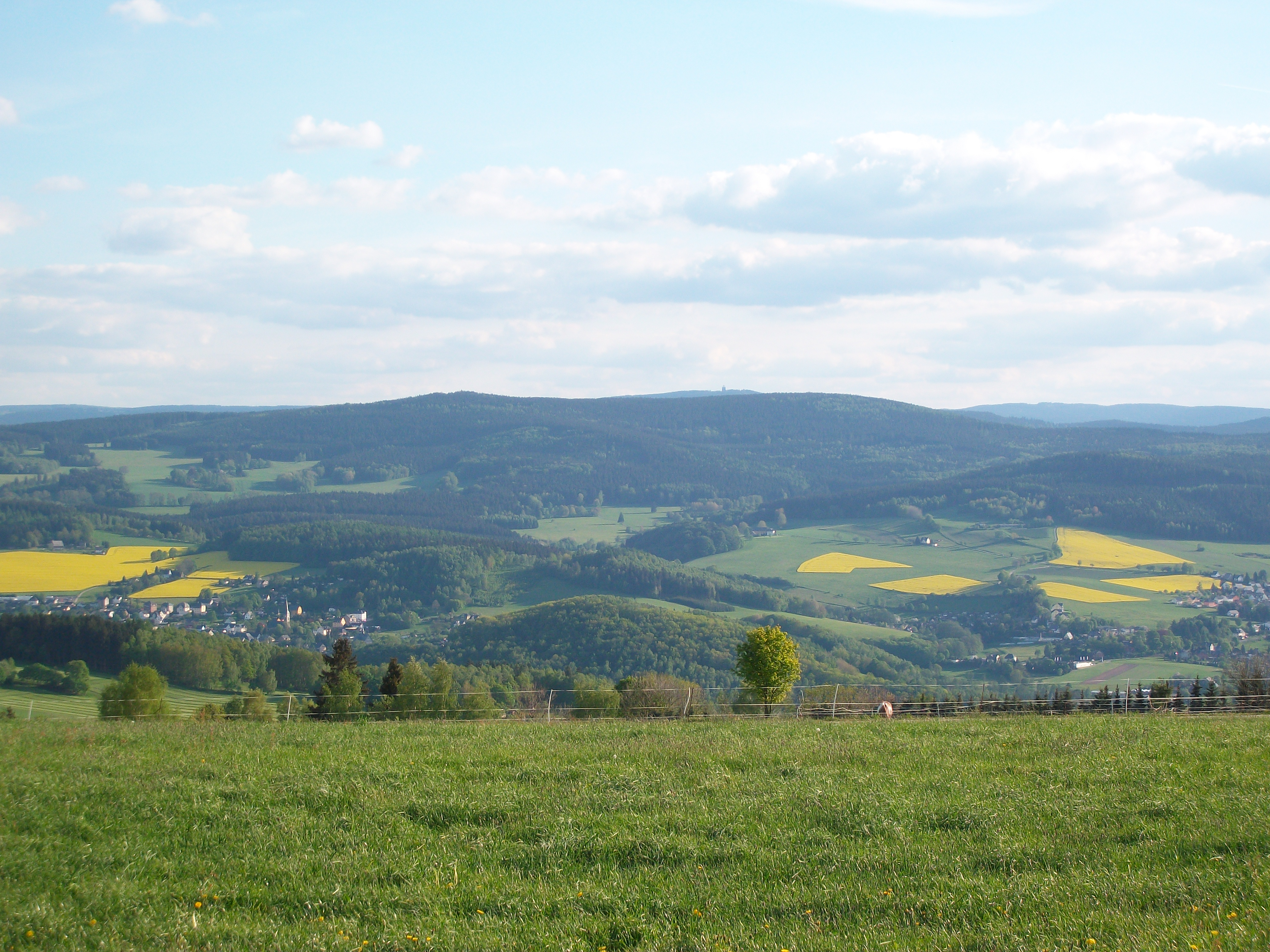
- Bernsbach, Blick zur Morgenleithe and Auersperg (2016)

Highest point
- Elevation: 811 m (2,661 ft)

Geography
- Location: Saxony, Germany

Morgenleithe is a mountain of Saxony, southeastern Germany.
