= List of mountains in the Ore Mountains =

This list of mountains shows a selection of the highest and best-known peaks in the Ore Mountains (German: Erzgebirge, Czech: Krušné hory) of Central Europe (in order of elevation):

- Klínovec (Keilberg), 1,244 m, highest peak in the Ore Mountains
- Fichtelberg, 1,215 m, highest peak in Saxony
- Božídarský Špičák (Gottesgaber Spitzberg), 1,115 m
- Meluzína (Wirbelstein), 1,094 m
- Blatenský vrch (Plattenberg), 1,043 m
- Eisenberg, 1,028 m
- Plešivec (Pleßberg), 1,028 m
- Auersberg, 1,019 m
- Taufichtig, 1,001 m
- Jelení hora (Haßberg), 993 m
- Tisovský vrch, 976 m
- Velký Špičák (Großer Spitzberg or Schmiedeberger Spitzberg), 965 m
- Brückenberg, 964 m
- Loučná (Wieselstein), 956 m, highest peak in the Eastern Ore Mountains
- Aschberg, 936 m
- Rehhübel, 932 m
- Medvědí skála (Bernsteinberg), 924 m
- Riesenberg, 923 m
- Lesenská pláň (Hübladung), 921 m
- Na strašidlech, 913 m
- Rabenberg, 913 m
- Lesná (mountain) (Ladung), 911 m
- Mědník (Kupferhübel), 910 m
- Pramenáč (Bornhauberg), 909 m
- Kahleberg, 905 m, highest elevation in the Saxon part of the Eastern Ore Mountains
- Bärenstein, 898 m, basalt table mountain
- Fastenberg, 891 m
- Hirtstein, 888 m
- Leistnerhübel, 879 m
- Bouřňák (Stürmer), 869 m
- Stropník, 856 m
- Čihadlo, 842 m
- Ochsenkopf bei Rittersgrün, 836 m
- Pöhlberg, 832 m, Basalt-Tafelberg
- Geisingberg, 824 m
- Ochsenkopf bei Jägerhaus, 823 m
- Steinhübel, 817 m
- Morgenleithe, 811 m
- Komáří hůrka (Mückenberg), 808 m, widely known as the Mückentürmchen
- Scheibenberg, 807 m, basalt table mountain
- Drachenkopf bei Nassau, 805 m
- Olověný vrch, 802 m
- Sauberg, 797 m
- Kuhberg, 795 m
- Schwartenberg, 789 m
- Kohlhaukuppe, 786 m
- Adlerfels, 778 m
- Schatzenstein, 760 m
- Greifensteine, 731 m
- Spiegelwald, 728 m
- Špičák (Sattelberg), 723 m
- Nakléřovská výšina, 703 m
- Roter Burg 668 m
- Adlerstein, 676 m
- Hirschenstein (Saxony), 610.4 m

== See also ==
- List of mountains in Saxony
