= Meluzína =

Mountain in the Czech Republic

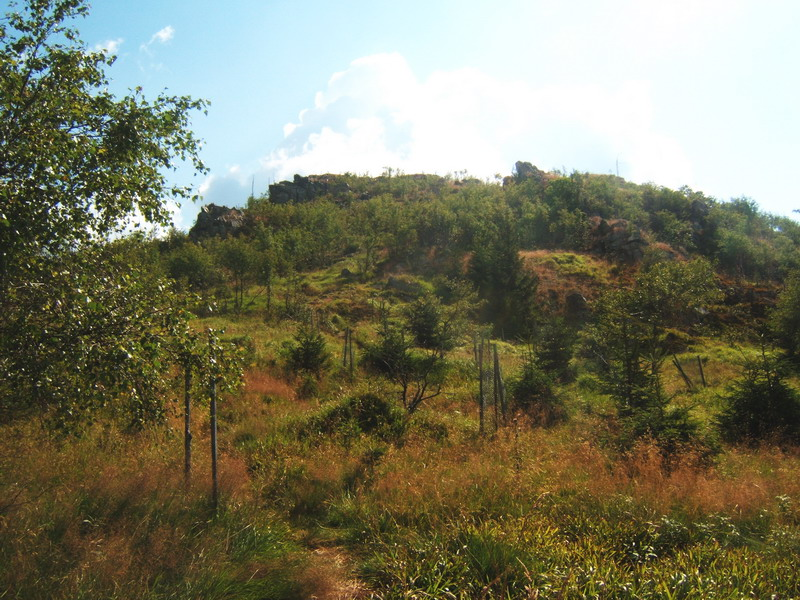
- Path on the Meluzína or Wirbelstein

Highest point
- Elevation: 1,094.1 m n.m. (3,590 ft)
- Coordinates: 50°23′25″N 13°00′28″E

Geography
- Location within Czech Republic
- Location: Karlovarsky kraj, Czech Republic
- Parent range: Ore Mountains

Geology
- Mountain type: ridge
- Rock type: eclogite

The Meluzína (German: Wirbelstein) is a 1,094-metre-high (3,589 ft) mountain in the central Ore Mountains in the Czech Republic.

== Location ==
The Meluzína or Wirbelstein lies three kilometres east of the highest peak in the range, the Klínovec, near the road from Boží Dar to Měděnec on the actual crest of the Ore Mountains.

== Ascents ==
- The Meluzína lies on the red marked ridgeway of the Ore Mountains (European walking route E3). An ascent of the summit is possible over an unmarked branching trail.
- The road from Boží Dar to Měděnec is also a good starting point (turn off to Pod Meluzínou).

== Geology ==
Many minerals can be seen in coarse-grained bands.

- Quartz
- Amphibole
- Zoisite

== Views ==
- West
  - Klínovec
- North
  - Fichtelberg
  - Wind turbines near Háj u Loučné
  - Bärenstein
  - Pöhlberg
  - Wind power station near Jöhstadt
- East
  - Velký Špičák
  - Jelení hora
  - Kupferhübel mit Měděnec
  - Brown coal power station near Kadaň
- South
  - Ohře valley and Ostrov nad Ohří
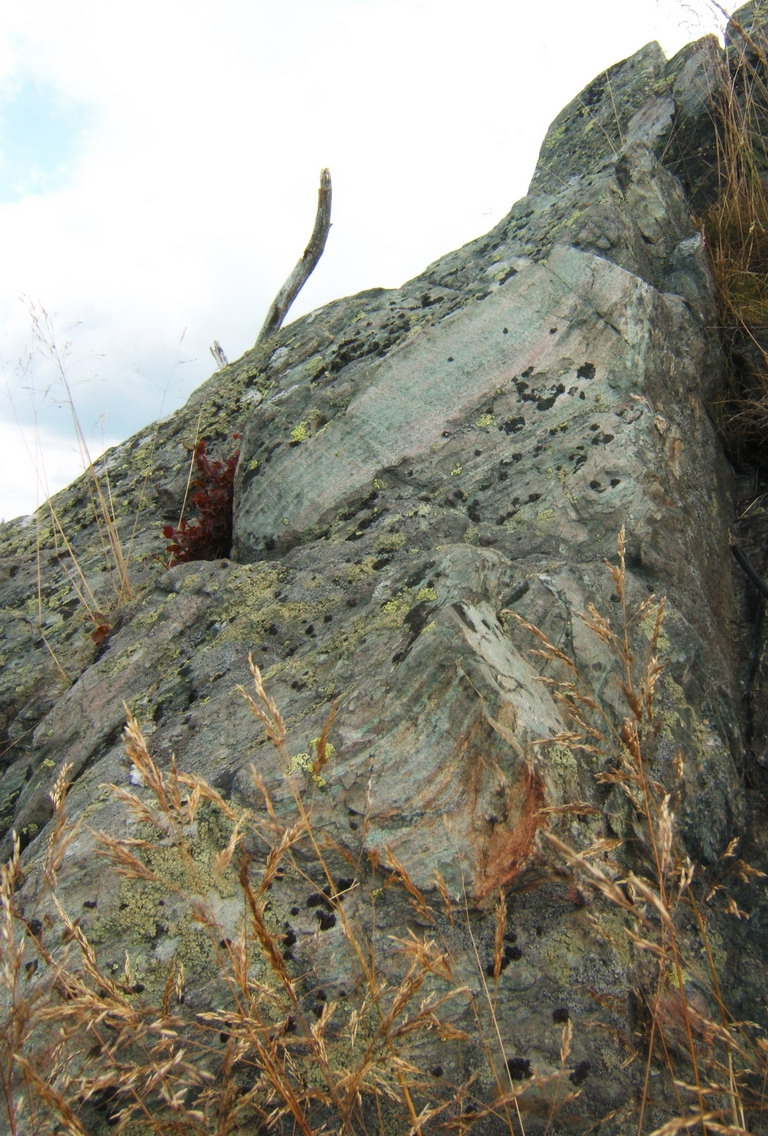
Rocks on the Meluzína

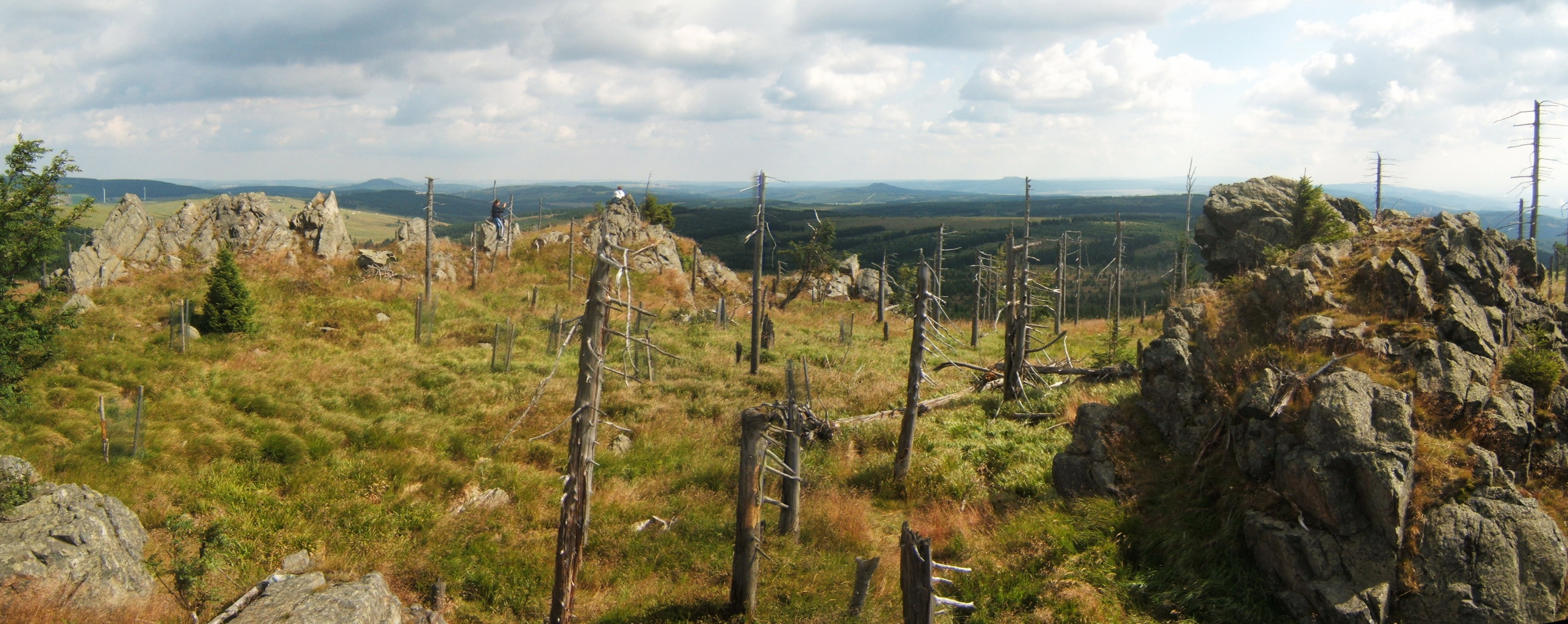
On the summit of the Meluzína
