= Oberwiesenthal =

- Town
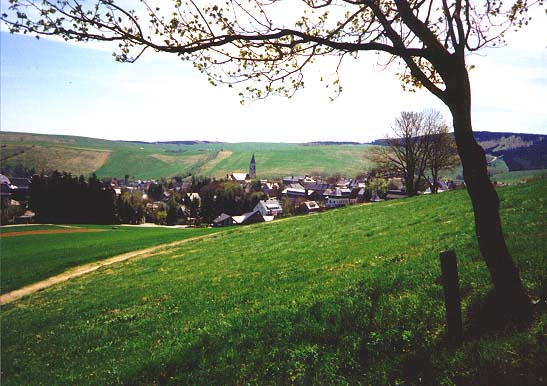
- May 2001 view of Oberwiesenthal

- Coat of arms

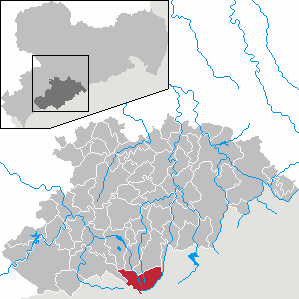
- Location of Oberwiesenthal within Erzgebirgskreis district
- Interactive map of Oberwiesenthal
- Location within Germany Location within Saxony
- Coordinates: 50°25′9″N 12°58′15″E
- Country: Germany
- State: Saxony
- District: Erzgebirgskreis

Government
  - Mayor (2021–28): Jens Benedict

Area
  - Total: 40.02 km^{2} (15.45 sq mi)
- Elevation: 914 m (2,999 ft)

Population (2025-12-31)
  - Total: 1,907
  - Density: 47.65/km^{2} (123.4/sq mi)
- Time zone: UTC+01:00 (CET)
  - Summer (DST): UTC+02:00 (CEST)
- Postal codes: 09484
- Dialling codes: 037348
- Vehicle registration: ERZ, ANA, ASZ, AU, MAB, MEK, STL, SZB, ZP
- Website: www.oberwiesenthal.de

Oberwiesenthal (German: [oːbɐˈviːzn̩taːl]; officially Kurort Oberwiesenthal) is a town and a ski resort in the district of Erzgebirgskreis in Saxony in Germany. It is situated in the Ore Mountains, on the border with the Czech Republic, 19 km south of Annaberg-Buchholz, and 23 km northeast of Karlovy Vary. At 914 metres (2,999 ft), it is the highest town in Germany. The Olympic and World Championships goldmedalist in ski jumping Jens Weißflog competed for SC Tractor Oberwiesenthal and Oberwiesenthaler SV.

== Geography ==
Oberwiesenthal lies in the county of Erzgebirgskreis, on the border with the Czech Republic that follows the course of the Pöhlbach stream as far as Bärenstein (10 km northeast). The highest elevation in the borough is the Fichtelberg (sometimes called the Großer Fichtelberg or Great Fichtelberg) which, at 1,215 m above NN, is the highest mountain in Saxony.

Other important mountains in the region around Oberwiesenthal are the:

- Keilberg (Klínovec) (1,244 m above NN; the highest summit in the Ore Mountains)
- Kleiner or Hinterer Fichtelberg (1,206 m above NN) ("Little or Farther Fichtelberg")
- Eisenberg (1,029 m above NN)

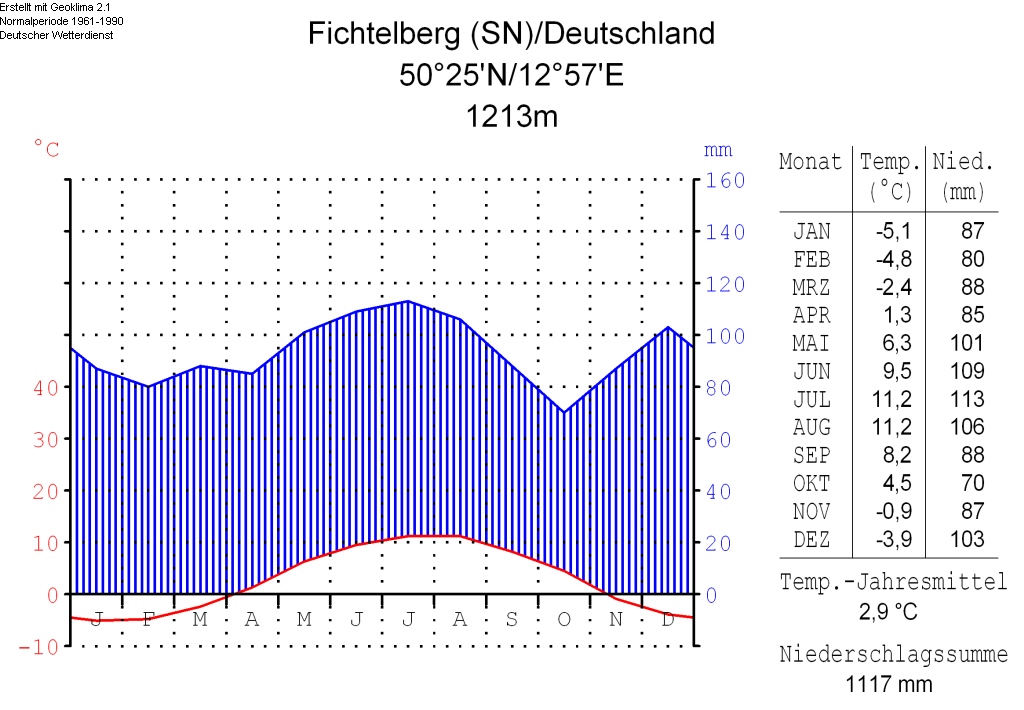
Climatic diagram for the Fichtelberg near Oberwiesenthal

Owing its elevation and relatively northern latitude, Oberwiesenthal has a subalpine respectively subarctic climate (Dfc).

=== Neighbouring municipalities ===
On the Czech side is the municipality of Loučná pod Klínovcem (Böhmisch Wiesenthal) and, further west, is Boží Dar (Gottesgab). Adjacent municipalities in Germany are Bärenstein, Crottendorf, Sehmatal, Breitenbrunn/Erzgeb. and Raschau-Markersbach.

=== Subdivisions ===
- Oberwiesenthal
- Unterwiesenthal
- Hammerunterwiesenthal
- Rotes Vorwerk
- Neues Haus

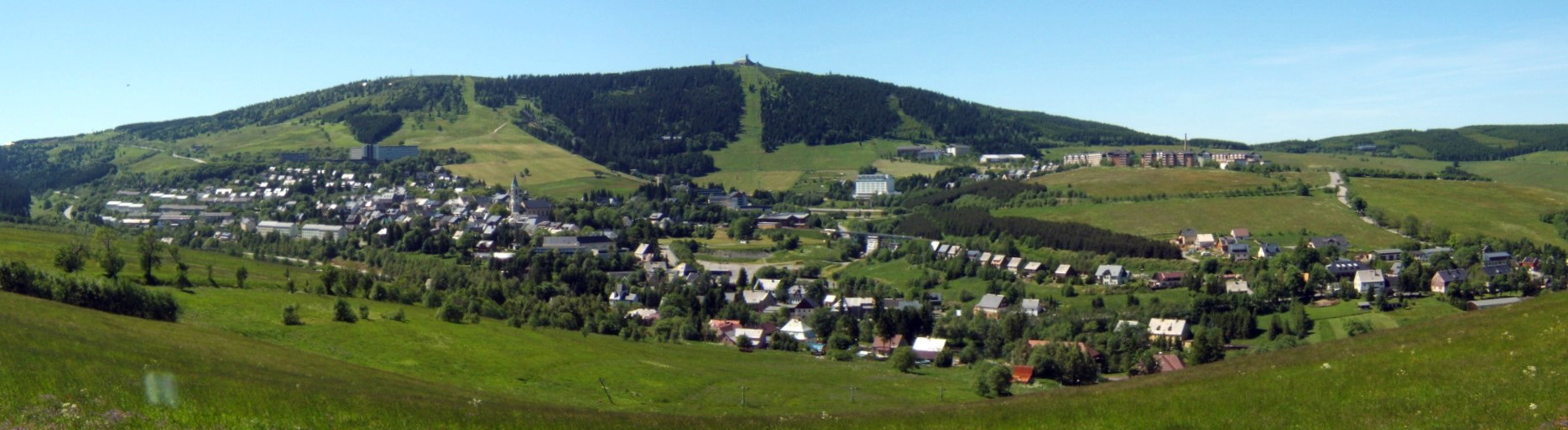
View of Oberwiesenthal and the Fichtelberg from the opposite side of the border (the cemetery at Háj)

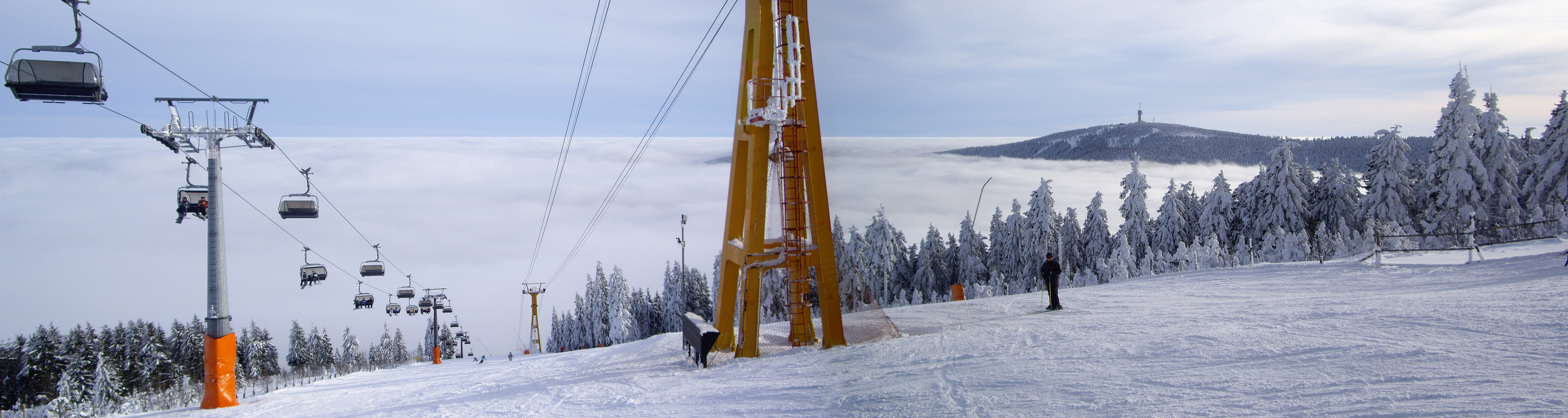
Winter's view from the Great Fichtelberg

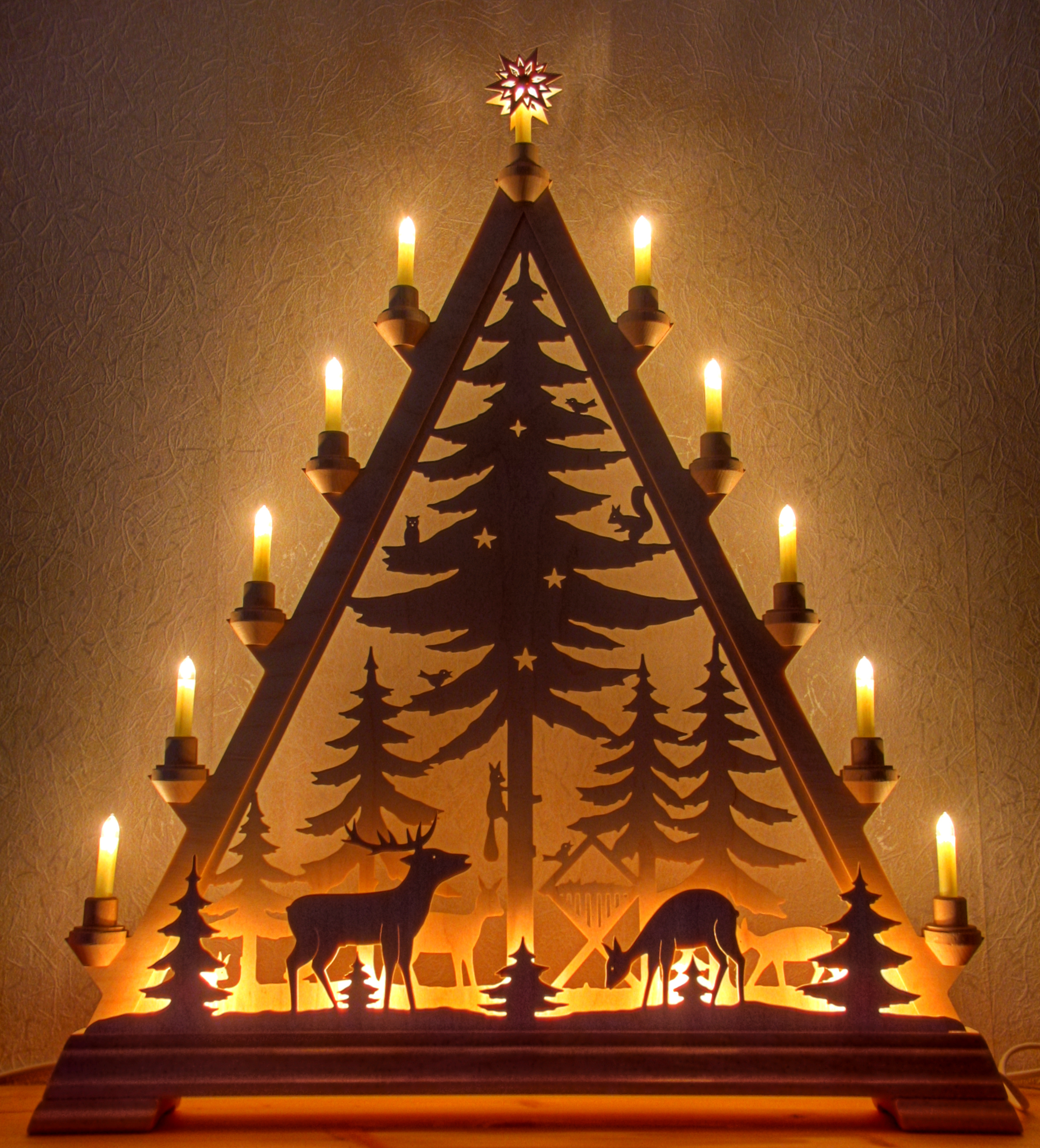
An Oberwiesenthal candle arch or Schwibbogen

== History ==
The "new town in the Wiesen valley" ("Neustadt am Wiesenthal") was founded in 1527 by the lords of Schönburg as a mining town because, one year earlier, silver ore had been found in the region. By 1530 the new settlement had been granted town rights and, in 1559, its ownership passed to the House of Wettin.

Mining operations finally wound up in the 19th century and tourism increasingly took its place during the 20th. However, after the Second World War, there were attempts by the Russians to mine uranium for the nuclear arms race in the Zechengrund, today a nature reserve. Traces of their activity are still visible. On 1 September 1921 Oberwiesenthal was merged with the town of Unterwiesenthal further down the valley, which had first been mentioned in the records in 1406 and had town rights by 1510. From 1952 to 1990, Oberwiesenthal was part of the Bezirk Karl-Marx-Stadt of East Germany.

=== Historical population ===
Year	Population
1559	95 villeins (besessene Mann)
1748	190 villeins
1834	1278
1871	1980
1890	1967
1910	1729

Year	Population
1925	2425
1939	2446
1946	2945
1950	4603
1964	2553
1971	2611

Year	Population
1990	1621
1998	3381
1999	3273
2000	3163
2001	3069
2002	3015

Year	Population
2003	2925
2004	2828
2005	2735
2006	2675
2007	2592
2009	2501

Data source to 1990: Oberwiesenthal in the Digital Historic Index of Places in Saxony (Digitales Historisches Ortsverzeichnis von Sachsen)
Data source from 1998: Statistisches Landesamt Sachsen

== Politics ==
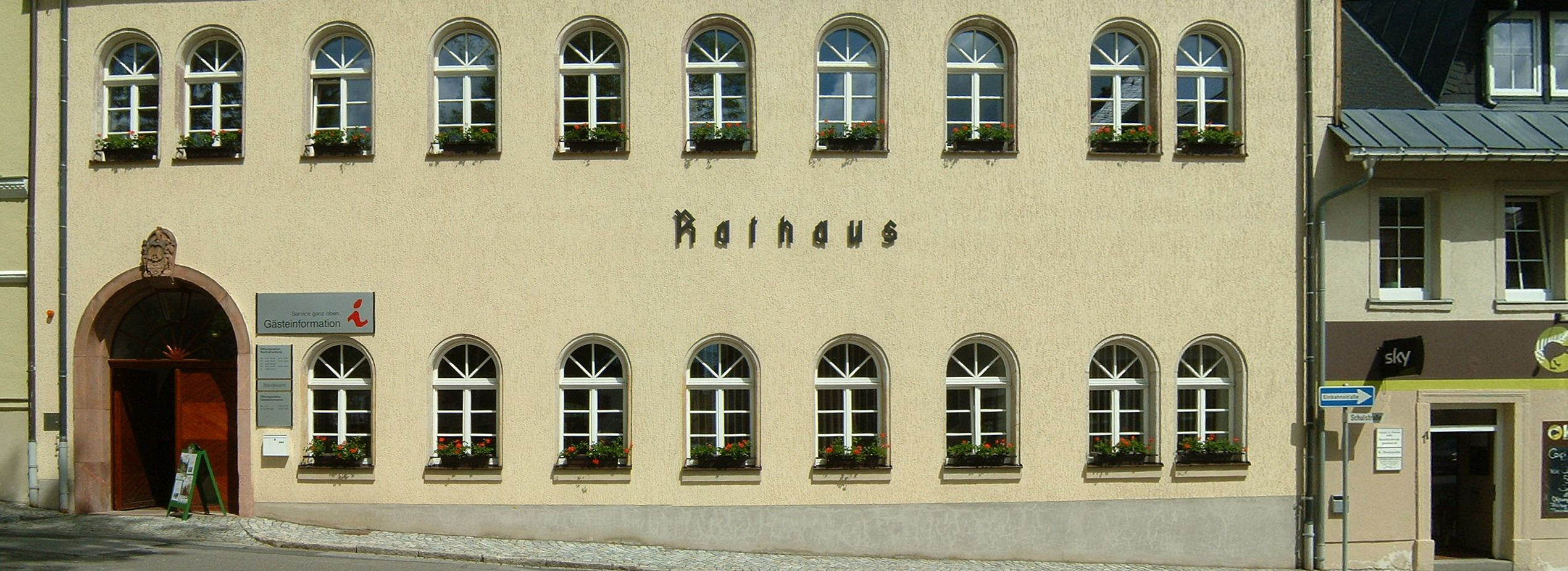
Town hall (Rathaus)

=== Town council ===
The town council of Oberwiesenthal consists of 14 councillors and the directly elected mayor or Bürgermeister, who presides over the council. The local elections of 7 June 2009, which had a voter participation of 62.5%, the following result:

Party	FDP	CDU	BfW	Die Alternative	Die Linke	Total
Seats	5	5	2	2	0	14
Stimmenanteil	35.1%	33.4%	13.5%	12.6%	5.4%	

=== Mayor ===
Heinz-Michael Kirsten (CDU) was elected mayor (Bürgermeister) in January 2002. By February 2002 the Annaberg district office (Landratsamt Annaberg) had declared this result void due to unpermitted election advertising. This resulted in a five-year legal battle by all sides that ended with a decision in 2007 by the Federal Administrative Court in Leipzig, that confirmed the decision in February 2007 by the administrative appeals tribunal (Oberverwaltungsgericht) of Bautzen as legal. Heinz-Michael Kirsten was then sent on leave by the regional authority (Regierungspräsidium). On 4 November 2007 a new election took place in which no party achieved an absolute majority. In the second round of elections on 18 November the independent (now FDP) candidate, Mirko Ernst, was elected mayor. The current mayor is Jens Benedict, elected in September 2021.

=== Twinnings ===
- Germany Fichtelberg, town "friendship" (Städtefreundschaft) since 3 October 1990
- Germany Lauf an der Pegnitz, town friendship since 3 October 1990
- Germany Schonach im Schwarzwald, town friendship since 3 October 1990
- Japan Hakuba, twin town since 18 August 2002

== Culture and sights ==
- Fichtelberg Railway
- Fichtelberg Cable Car (the oldest cable car in Germany)
- Oberwiesenthal post coach in the style of the Deutsche Reichspost of 1939

=== Museum ===
- Ski and local history museum, Karlsbader Straße 3

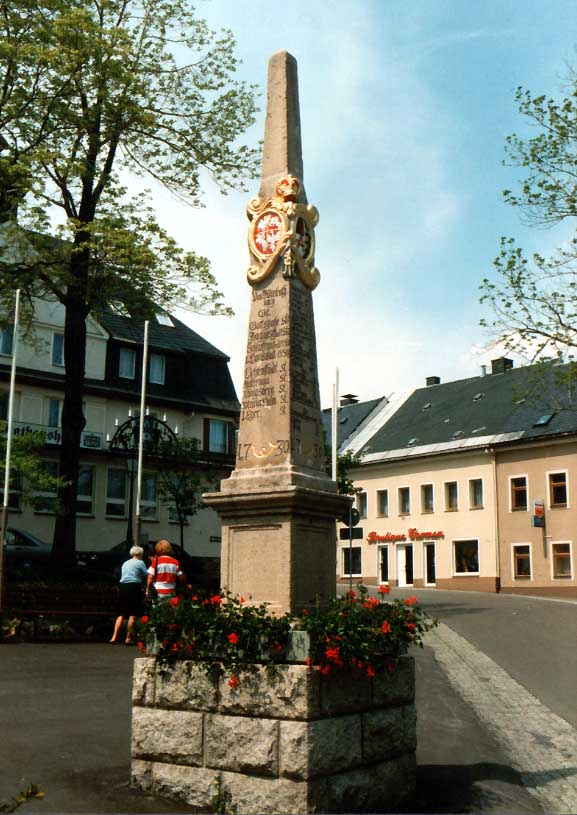
Electorate of Saxony postal milepost on the market square

=== Structures ===
- St Martin Luther's Church with its Hertelt crib
- Distance post on the market square (Marktplatz); whole milepost on the footpath to the "New House" (Neues Haus) in the Zechengrund and remnants of a half-milepost from the village of Hammerunterwiesenthal
- Royal Saxon station stone from the market square at the Neues Haus border crossing
- Anton Günther Way, a cross-border trail

=== Sport ===
- Currently the leading sports club in the town: WSC Erzgebirge Oberwiesenthal
- Leading former East German Alpine and Nordic ski club, disbanded in 1990: SC Traktor Oberwiesenthal
- Sportfördergruppe der Bundeswehr, armed forces sports centre

== Notable people ==
- Franz Ströher (1874-1936), German hairdresser and businessman

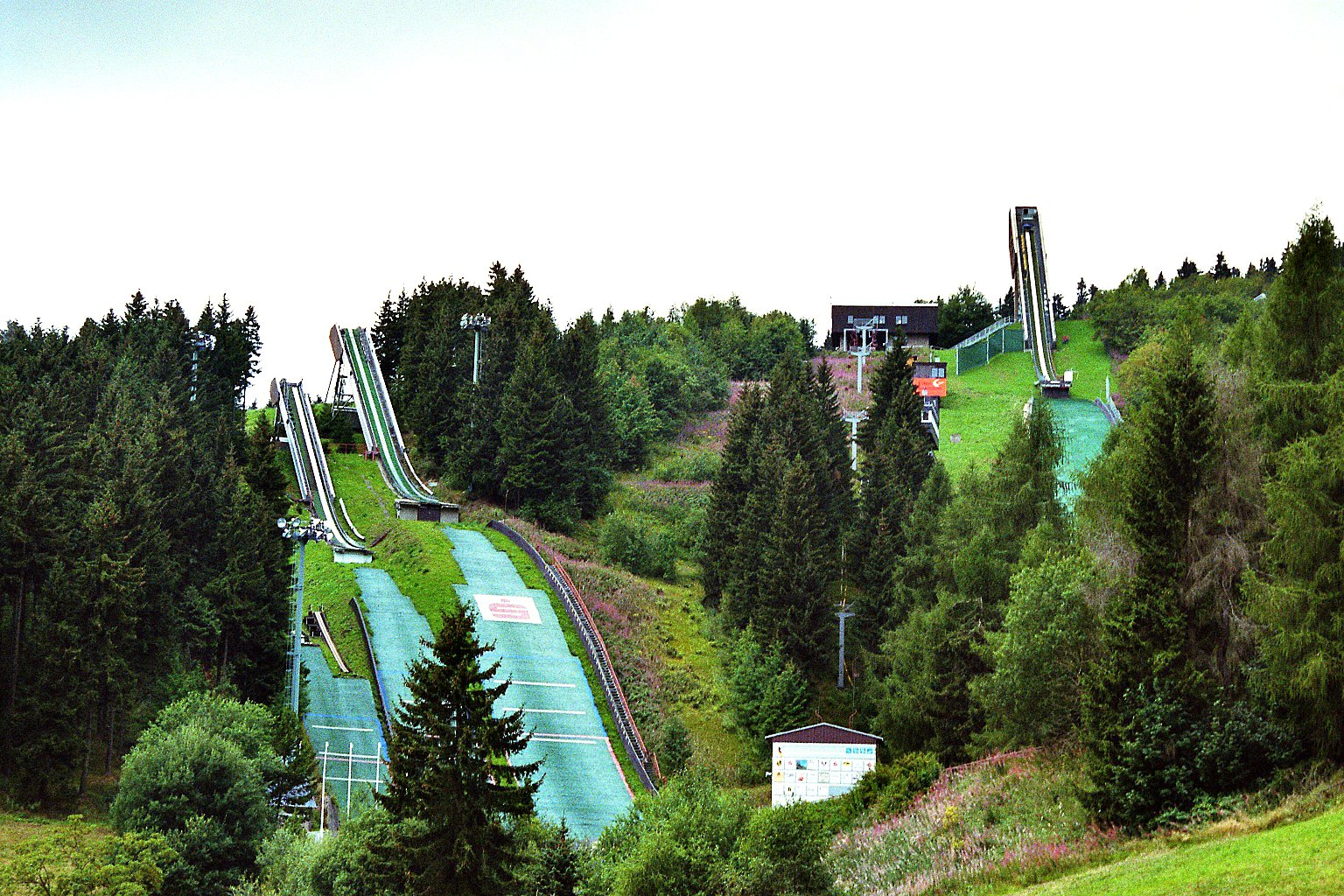
The Fichtelberg ski jumps
