= Fuchshöhe =

Mountain in Germany

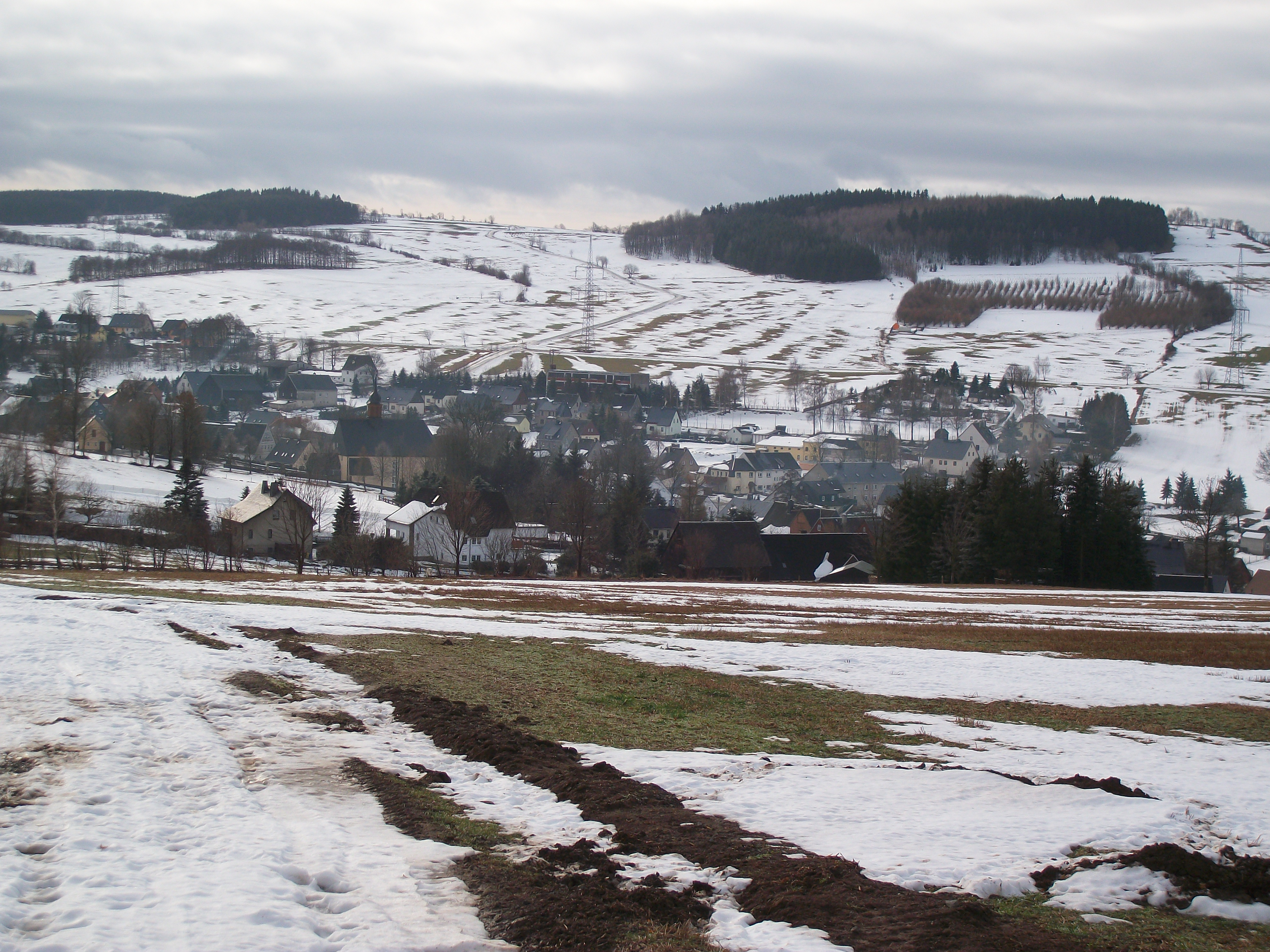

Highest point
- Elevation: 728 m (2,388 ft)

Geography
- Location: Saxony, Germany
- Parent range: Ore Mountains

Fuchshöhe is a mountain in the Ore Mountains in Saxony, Germany. With a height of 728.1 metres (2,389 ft) above sea level, it is the highest mountain of the municipality of Mildenau in the Erzgebirgskreis. It is a popular destination for hikers and cyclists, especially since there is the possibility of signing a summit book.

== Geographical location ==
The Fuchshöhe is located southeast of Arnsfeld. It separates the valleys of the Rauschenbach in the east and the Arnsfelder Dorfbach in the west. Both run northwards, where they flow into the Preßnitz in Niederschmiedeberg. In terms of natural regional division, the Fuchshöhe belongs to the Saxon Ore Mountains. In the finer subdivision, it lies in the Central Ore Mountains on the ridge on the upper Preßnitz.

From the Fuchshöhe, the following surrounding mountains can be seen: Pöhlberg (831.1 m) near Annaberg-Buchholz in the west, the Bärenstein (897.8 m) near the municipality of the same name in the southwest and the Haßberg (994 m) in the Czech part of the Ore Mountains in the southeast.

== Fuchshöhenkönig ==
As part of the Grenzlandtour cycling event, sports enthusiasts can tackle the 2.2 km long mountain route from the sports center in Arnsfeld (part of Mildenau) to Fuchshöhe all year round in the disciplines of mountain biking, e-biking and running. The Fuchshöhen King award ceremony takes place annually on the day of the Grenzlandtour event. The distance to Fuchshöhe involves a difference in altitude of 126 meters.
