= Leistnerhübel =

Mountain in Saxony, Germany

- Location within Saxony

Highest point
- Elevation: 879 m (2,884 ft)
- Coordinates: 50°26′16″N 12°38′19″E

Geography
- Location: Saxony, Germany

Leistnerhübel is a mountain of Saxony, southeastern Germany. It is 879m high, and is located 1 km south Ore Mountains.

== Name origin ==
The hill was named after Hermann Leistner, the senior forestry official (“Oberforstwart”) from Wildenthal, in recognition of his work caring for the forest around the Auersberg. After Leistner’s death on 25 November 1933, Forstmeister Dick, head of the Wildenthal forestry office, forwarded the request to the Saxon State Forestry Administration that the hill should receive this name. Before that, the summit was known as the Storpsgehau.

== Tourism ==
At the foot of the Leistnerhübel and Schöne Aussicht (883 m), the Amselpfad winds its way through the forest. This hiking trail doubles as a cross-country ski route in winter and provides access to the Kammloipe. The trail runs from Wildenthal to Oberwildenthal, continuing on the old Reichsstraße 93 toward the Hischenstander Pass, which since 1997 has been a border crossing for pedestrians, skiers, and cyclists into Jelení in Bohemia.

This path has cultural and historical significance, linking the two regions and providing year-round access for outdoor activities. The Hischenstander Pass's designation as a border crossing since 1997 reflects the changes following the dissolution of Czechoslovakia and the creation of a new Czech–German border.
