= Taufichtig =

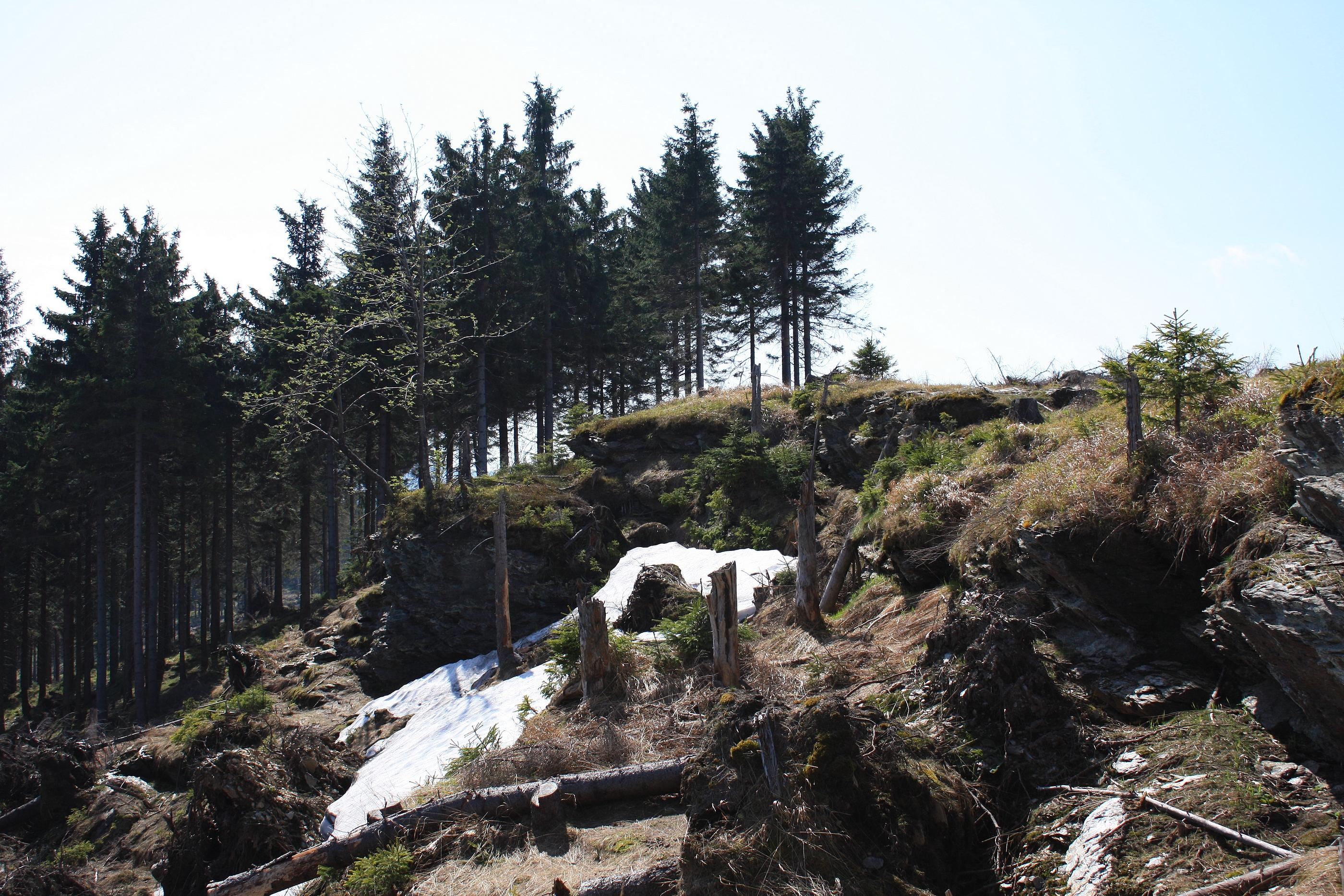
- The summit of the Taufichtig

Highest point
- Elevation: 1,000.7 m above sea level (HN) (3,283 ft)
- Prominence: 9 m → Fichtelberg
- Isolation: 0.7 km → Fichtelberg
- Coordinates: 50°27′22″N 12°54′15″E

Geography
- Location within Saxony
- Location: Saxony, Germany
- Parent range: Ore Mountains

Geology
- Mountain type: ridge
- Rock type: phyllite

The Taufichtig is a 1,001-metre-high (3,284 ft) peak northwest of the Fichtelberg massif in the upper Ore Mountains in Germany.

== Location and area ==
The summit is the northwestern spur of the Ore Mountain plateau and barely rises above it (only about 9 metres). Nevertheless, it drops away to the northeast into the valley of the Große Mittweida by around 250 metres. On this slope is the Taufichtig nature reserve named after it. In the vicinity of the Taufichtig is the abandoned village of Erbendorf.

== Routes to the top ==
The mountaintop may be reached over the yellow signposted hiking trail from Crottendorf to Tellerhäuser which touches the summit and makes the nature reserve accessible to walkers. There are other, smaller paths around the summit to the side of the main hiking routes.
