= Fichtelberg Cable Car =

German cable car in the Ore Mountains in Saxony

Coordinates: 50°25′38″N 12°57′32″E

Fichtelberg Aerial Tramway
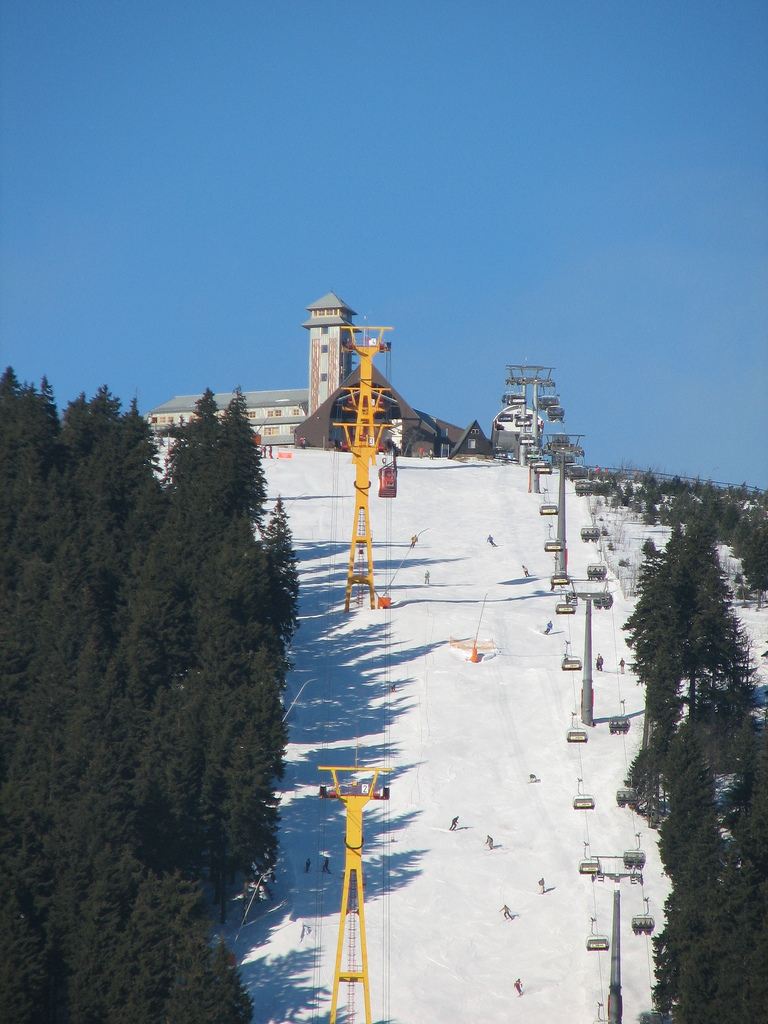
- View of the Fichtelberg with its cable car
- Interactive map of Fichtelberg Aerial Tramway

Overview
- Status: Operational
- Character: Elevated
- Location: Oberwiesenthal, Saxony, Germany
- Termini: Oberwiesenthal; Fichtelberg
- No. of stations: 2
- Open: December 29, 1924

Technical features
- Aerial lift type: Cable car
- Line length: 1,175 m (3,855 ft)
- Notes: 302.9 m (994 ft); Electric motor powering cable bullwheel

The Fichtelberg Cable Car (German: Fichtelberg Schwebebahn) is a German cable car in the Ore Mountains in Saxony that runs from the town of Oberwiesenthal to the Fichtelberg mountaintop. It is the oldest cable car in Germany, leading from the valley station at an altitude of 905 metres above sea level to the top station at 1,208 metres above sea level, having a length of 1,175 metres and a maximum upward gradient of 50 per cent. The Fichtelberg Cable Car is equipped with two carrying and two hauling cables.

Operations began in December 1924. The Fichtelberg Cable Car temporarily ceased operation in 1948 due to lack of maintenance during World War II. After a major overhaul, it reopened in 1956. Another major renovation took place in 1984, when one of the support towers was removed and the others were relocated.

== Sources ==
- Mario Schatz: Seilbahnen der DDR. transpress VEB Verlag für Verkehrswesen, Berlin 1987, ISBN 3-344-00159-0.
