= Schatzenstein =

Mountain in Germany

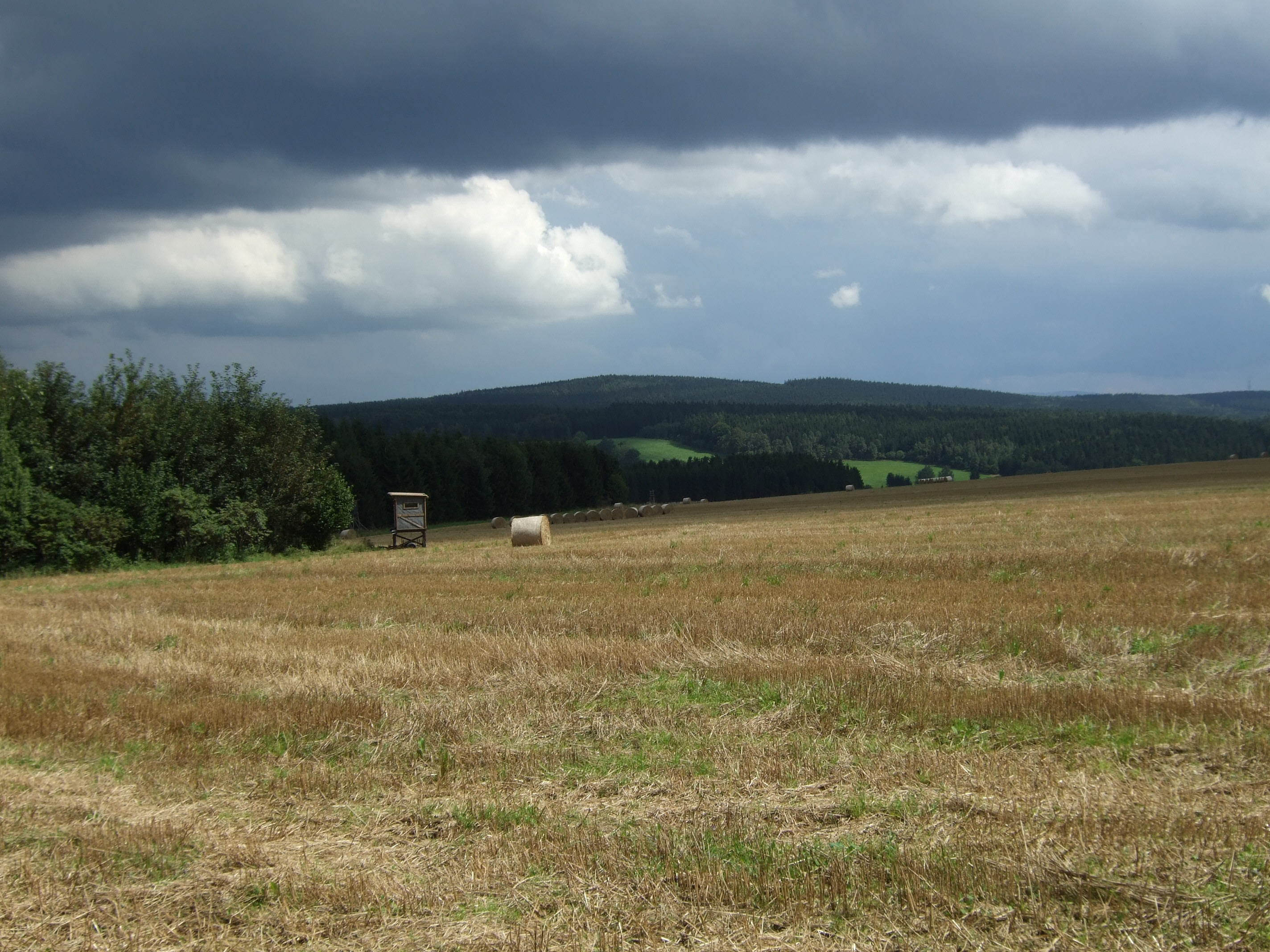
- Schatzenstein seen from Grünhain

Highest point
- Elevation: 760.4 m (2,495 ft)
- Coordinates: 50°35′31″N 12°50′36″E

Geography
- Location within Saxony
- Location: Saxony, Germany

Schatzenstein is a mountain of Saxony, southeastern Germany. It is located northwest of Elterlein at the municipal boundary to Zwönitz and Grünhain-Beierfeld on a local watershed which divides the drainage basins of Zwönitz river and Schwarzwasser. Several phyllite cliffs of up to 10 m height are exposed in the vicinity of the mountain.

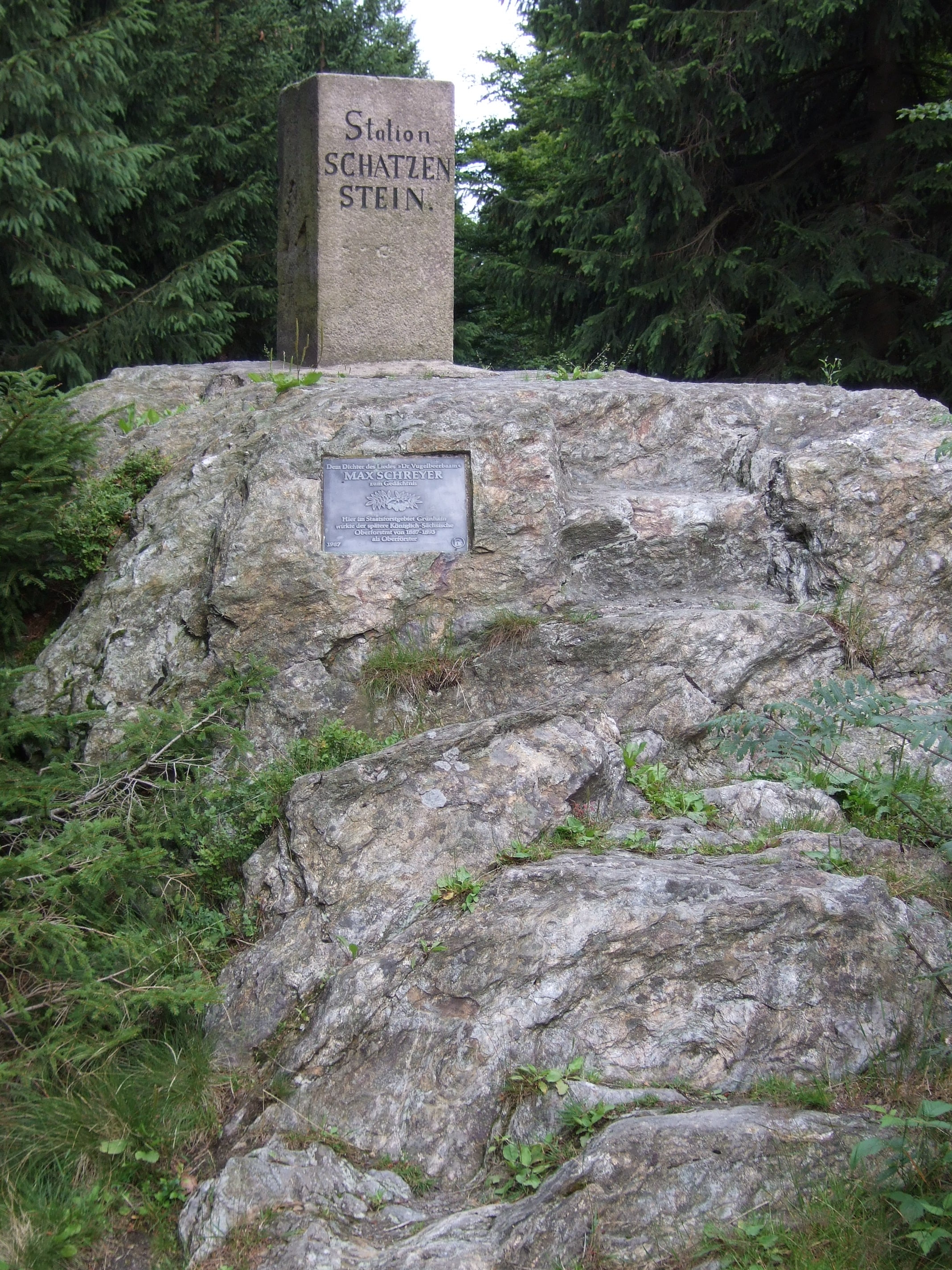
Triangulation marker and commemorative plaque on Schatzenstein summit

A marker of the Royal Saxon triangulation campaign of 1862 to 1890 stands on the summit of Schatzenstein. Beneath it, a commemorative plaque for the forester and poet Max Schreyer is mounted to the rock.
