= Eisenberg (Ore Mountains) =

Mountain in Germany

Coordinates: 50°26′31″N 12°58′17″E

Highest point
- Elevation: 1,028.3 m (3,374 ft)

Geography
- Location: Saxony, Germany

Eisenberg (German pronunciation: [ˈaɪzn̩bɛʁk]) is a mountain of Saxony, southeastern Germany.

== See also ==
- List of mountains in the Ore Mountains
