= Fichtelberg =

Mountain in the Ore Mountains of Germany

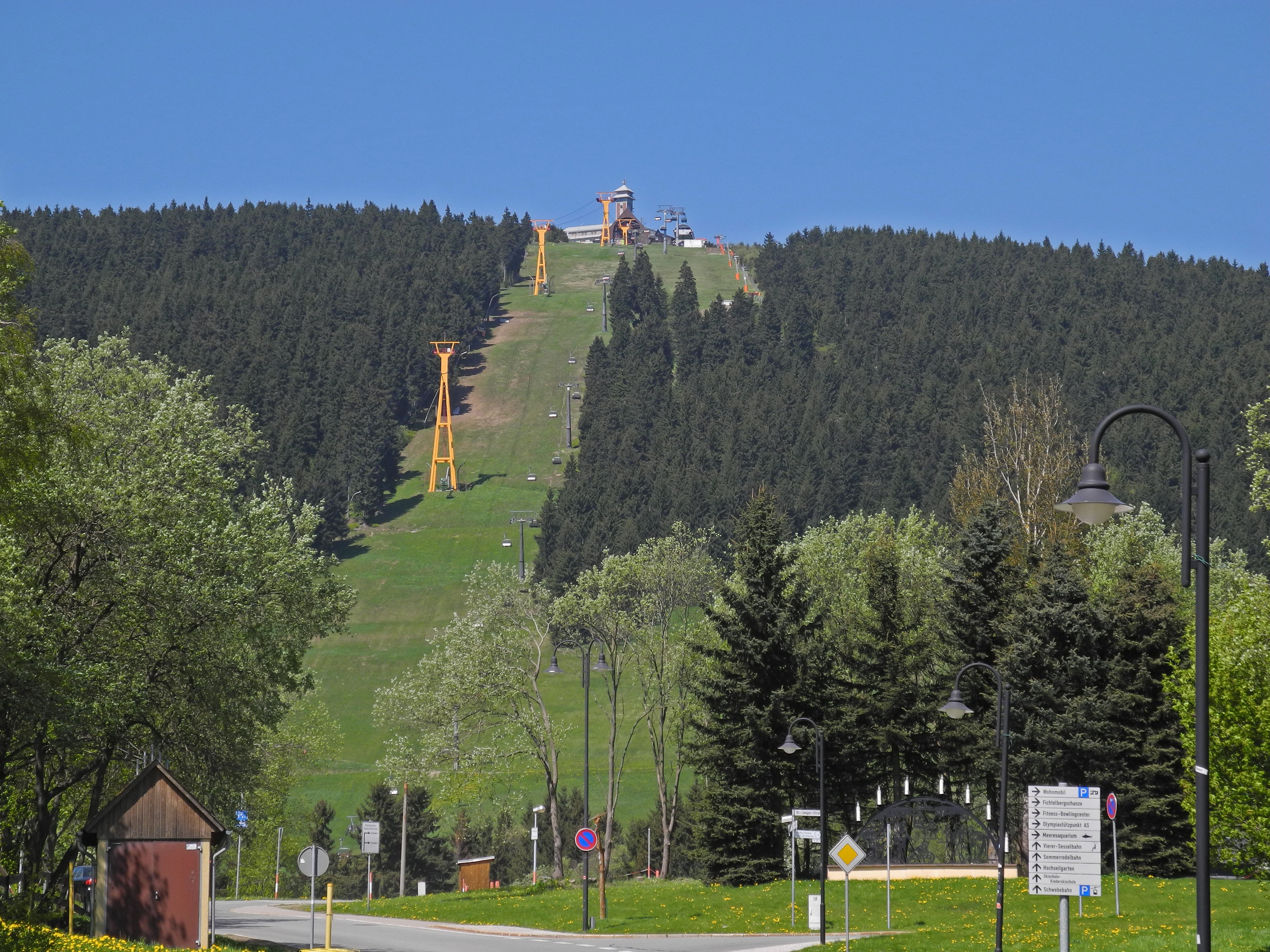

Highest point
- Elevation: 1,214.6 m (3,985 ft)
- Isolation: 3.26 km (2.03 mi) to Klínovec
- Coordinates: 50°25′43″N 12°57′17″E

Geography
- Location within Saxony
- Location: Saxony, Germany
- Parent range: Ore Mountains

The Fichtelberg (German pronunciation: [ˈfɪçtl̩bɛʁk]) is a mountain with two main peaks in the middle of the Ore Mountains in the east German state of Saxony, near the Czech border. At 1,214.6 m (3,985 ft) above sea level, the Fichtelberg is the highest mountain in Saxony, the second highest in the Ore Mountains and was formerly the highest mountain in East Germany. Its subpeak is 1,206 m (3,957 ft) high.

== Location ==
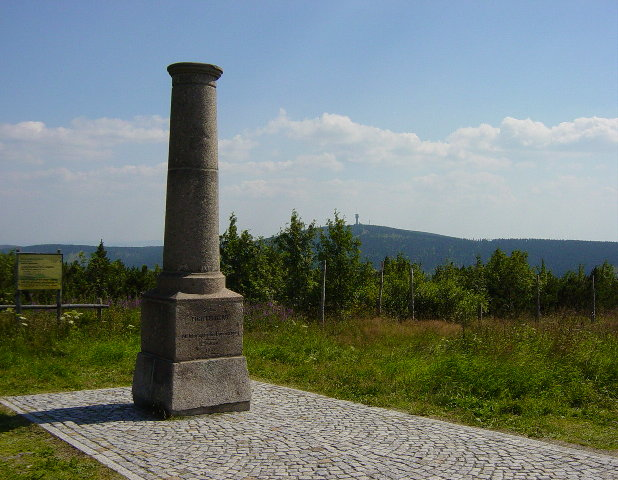
Historic trig point on the Fichtelberg, August 2004

The Fichtelberg rises within the Central Ore Mountains in the Ore Mountains/Vogtland Nature Park around 1.5 kilometres (0.93 mi) north of the German-Czech border. At the southern foot of the mountain lies the highest town in Germany: the resort of Oberwiesenthal in the Pöhlbach valley. About 750 metres (2,460 ft) south-southwest is the less prominent subpeak of the Fichtelberg, known as the Kleiner Fichtelberg ("Little Fichtelberg") also called the Hinterer Fichtelberg ("Rear Fichtelberg"); 1,205.6 m; 3,955 ft). About 4 kilometres (2.5 mi) south-southeast is the highest peak in the Ore Mountains: the Klínovec (Keilberg; 1,244 m; 4,081 ft) on the Czech side of the border. In the wet valley heads and raised bogs on the Fichtelberg, numerous streams have their sources. The most important of these is the River Zschopau.

== Geology ==
The Fichtelberg consists predominantly of light-coloured, crystalline rocks, especially a variety of muscovite slate (Muskovitschiefer). In the main, this rock only comprises quartz and muscovite, although it sometimes contains orthoclase and biotite as well. Additional components include rutile, garnet, tourmaline, hematite and ilmenite.

== Climate ==
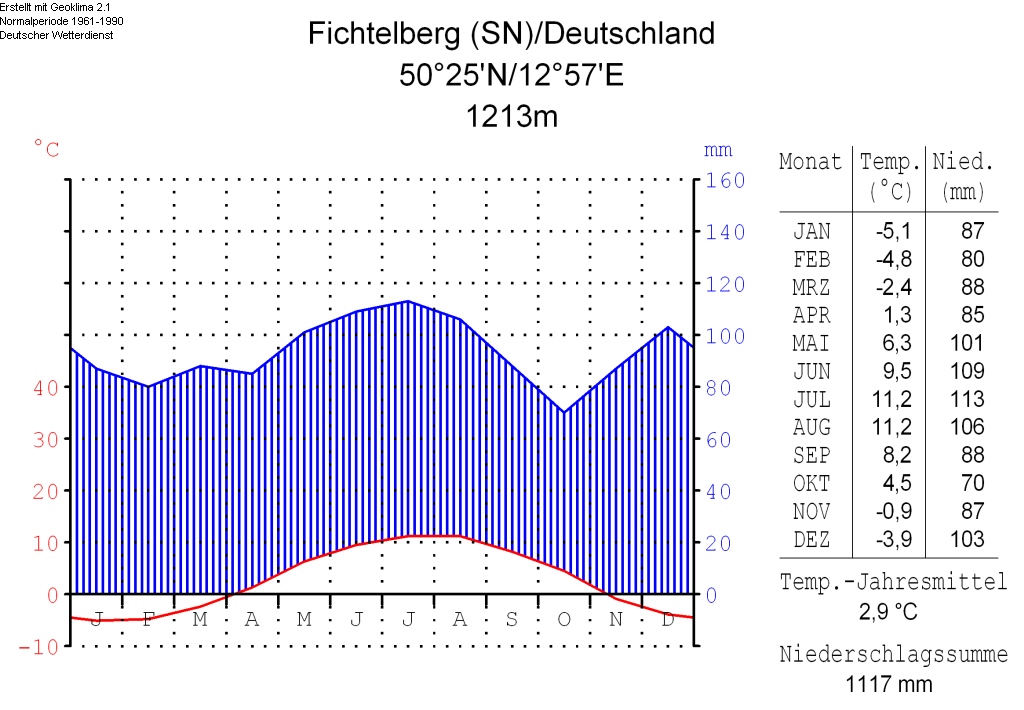
Climate chart for 1961-1990

Located in the interior of Central Europe, in the eastern half of Germany and at an altitude above 1,200 m (3,900 ft), Fichtelberg has a humid continental subarctic climate (Köppen: Dfc). Winters are cold though mild for latitude/elevation reason, snow can occur in large quantity and remains throughout the winter due to the low temperatures. Although unusual temperatures at or near 30 °C occur unlike places in the Alps, summer is usually cool. Together with the mild temperatures, the abundant precipitation above 1100 mm gives the climate some oceanic characteristics, except for the cold season. Normally the mountain is hazy, but the difference in sunshine between summer and winter is less than London, for example.

Since the 1891 data, there was a tendency for temperature to rise, although the years from 1950 to 1980 were particularly cold. By 2003 the increase was less than one tenth of a degree per year, but considerable for a large scale, the speed increased from 1980 to 2004, when the increase was half-a-degree per year.

The Fichtelberg weather station has recorded the following extreme values:

- Its highest temperature was 30.8 °C (87.4 °F) on 27 July 1983.
- Its lowest temperature was −30.4 °C (−22.7 °F) on 9 February 1956.
- Its greatest annual precipitation was 1,740.6 mm (68.53 in) in 1922.
- Its least annual precipitation was 719.4 mm (28.32 in) in 1892.
- The longest annual sunshine was 1,986.9 hours in 2003.
- The shortest annual sunshine was 1,016.5 hours in 1922.

Climate data for Fichtelberg Mountain (ridge): 1213m, 1991−2020 normals, extremes 1890–present
Month	Jan	Feb	Mar	Apr	May	Jun	Jul	Aug	Sep	Oct	Nov	Dec	Year
Record high °C (°F)	13.1 (55.6)	12.9 (55.2)	16.6 (61.9)	22.4 (72.3)	25.3 (77.5)	29.5 (85.1)	30.8 (87.4)	30.6 (87.1)	27.5 (81.5)	21.7 (71.1)	19.0 (66.2)	14.6 (58.3)	30.8 (87.4)
Mean maximum °C (°F)	5.7 (42.3)	7.1 (44.8)	10.1 (50.2)	16.3 (61.3)	20.0 (68.0)	23.3 (73.9)	24.3 (75.7)	24.4 (75.9)	19.8 (67.6)	16.2 (61.2)	12.4 (54.3)	7.1 (44.8)	26.3 (79.3)
Mean daily maximum °C (°F)	−1.8 (28.8)	−1.4 (29.5)	1.2 (34.2)	6.7 (44.1)	11.4 (52.5)	14.6 (58.3)	16.6 (61.9)	16.6 (61.9)	11.8 (53.2)	7.2 (45.0)	2.7 (36.9)	−0.6 (30.9)	7.1 (44.8)
Daily mean °C (°F)	−4.0 (24.8)	−3.8 (25.2)	−1.4 (29.5)	3.2 (37.8)	7.5 (45.5)	10.7 (51.3)	12.8 (55.0)	12.8 (55.0)	8.6 (47.5)	4.4 (39.9)	0.4 (32.7)	−2.8 (27.0)	4.0 (39.2)
Mean daily minimum °C (°F)	−6.2 (20.8)	−6.1 (21.0)	−3.8 (25.2)	0.1 (32.2)	4.1 (39.4)	7.4 (45.3)	9.5 (49.1)	9.7 (49.5)	6.0 (42.8)	2.1 (35.8)	−1.8 (28.8)	−4.9 (23.2)	1.4 (34.5)
Mean minimum °C (°F)	−14.3 (6.3)	−13.6 (7.5)	−10.0 (14.0)	−6.8 (19.8)	−1.9 (28.6)	1.6 (34.9)	4.4 (39.9)	4.2 (39.6)	0.8 (33.4)	−4.3 (24.3)	−8.5 (16.7)	−12.6 (9.3)	−16.9 (1.6)
Record low °C (°F)	−28.2 (−18.8)	−30.4 (−22.7)	−20.5 (−4.9)	−14.5 (5.9)	−9.3 (15.3)	−4.4 (24.1)	−1.6 (29.1)	0.0 (32.0)	−4.2 (24.4)	−16.3 (2.7)	−21.0 (−5.8)	−23.4 (−10.1)	−30.4 (−22.7)
Average precipitation mm (inches)	100.9 (3.97)	82.0 (3.23)	91.7 (3.61)	69.9 (2.75)	93.4 (3.68)	108.4 (4.27)	126.8 (4.99)	108.2 (4.26)	100.6 (3.96)	84.9 (3.34)	98.0 (3.86)	110.3 (4.34)	1,176.9 (46.33)
Average extreme snow depth cm (inches)	85.5 (33.7)	104.9 (41.3)	108.2 (42.6)	74.6 (29.4)	5.4 (2.1)	0.3 (0.1)	0 (0)	0 (0)	0.8 (0.3)	10.1 (4.0)	33.0 (13.0)	62.9 (24.8)	129.6 (51.0)
Average precipitation days (≥ 1.0 mm)	21.1	18.3	19.1	16.4	17.3	17.8	18.0	15.3	15.8	16.7	18.2	21.3	215.2
Average snowy days (≥ 1 cm)	30.5	27.9	30.5	22.3	2.0	0.1	0.0	0.0	0.3	5.4	16.4	28.2	164.6
Average relative humidity (%)	90.2	89.2	89.3	81.2	81.6	82.6	81.0	80.8	87.4	89.5	89.6	90.1	86.2
Mean monthly sunshine hours	64.5	79.7	110.5	163.5	183.9	181.1	198.1	196.0	141.7	106.0	68.8	61.8	1,552.6
Source 1: NOAA
Source 2: Deutscher Wetterdienst / SKlima.de

Climate data for Fichtelberg Mountain (ridge), elevation: 1213 m 1981-2010 normals
Month	Jan	Feb	Mar	Apr	May	Jun	Jul	Aug	Sep	Oct	Nov	Dec	Year
Mean daily maximum °C (°F)	−1.9 (28.6)	−1.9 (28.6)	0.8 (33.4)	5.8 (42.4)	11.2 (52.2)	13.7 (56.7)	16.1 (61.0)	16.0 (60.8)	11.5 (52.7)	7.1 (44.8)	2.0 (35.6)	−1.0 (30.2)	6.7 (44.1)
Daily mean °C (°F)	−4.3 (24.3)	−4.3 (24.3)	−1.8 (28.8)	2.4 (36.3)	7.3 (45.1)	9.9 (49.8)	12.2 (54.0)	12.1 (53.8)	8.2 (46.8)	4.2 (39.6)	−0.4 (31.3)	−3.3 (26.1)	3.5 (38.3)
Mean daily minimum °C (°F)	−6.6 (20.1)	−6.6 (20.1)	−4.1 (24.6)	−0.5 (31.1)	4.1 (39.4)	6.8 (44.2)	9.1 (48.4)	9.2 (48.6)	5.7 (42.3)	1.9 (35.4)	−2.6 (27.3)	−5.5 (22.1)	1.0 (33.8)
Average precipitation mm (inches)	87.9 (3.46)	82.3 (3.24)	96.2 (3.79)	71.6 (2.82)	88.3 (3.48)	102.2 (4.02)	120.1 (4.73)	122.3 (4.81)	93.5 (3.68)	74.9 (2.95)	100.4 (3.95)	102.2 (4.02)	1,125.8 (44.32)
Average precipitation days (≥ 1.0 mm)	20.2	18.2	20.0	15.9	17.4	17.9	17.6	15.5	16.1	16.0	18.9	20.6	213.7
Average relative humidity (%)	89.3	89.1	90.6	82.3	81.3	83.4	81.4	81.7	87.9	88.7	90.5	89.6	86.3
Mean monthly sunshine hours	68.3	79.7	100.0	154.1	182.9	170.6	194.9	192.5	137.1	111.5	61.8	61.5	1,518
Source: NOAA

Climate data for Fichtelberg Mountain (ridge), elevation: 1213 m, 1961-1990 normals
Month	Jan	Feb	Mar	Apr	May	Jun	Jul	Aug	Sep	Oct	Nov	Dec	Year
Mean daily maximum °C (°F)	−2.6 (27.3)	−2.1 (28.2)	0.5 (32.9)	4.9 (40.8)	10.5 (50.9)	13.8 (56.8)	15.5 (59.9)	15.4 (59.7)	12.1 (53.8)	7.8 (46.0)	1.6 (34.9)	−1.5 (29.3)	6.3 (43.3)
Daily mean °C (°F)	−5.1 (22.8)	−4.8 (23.4)	−2.4 (27.7)	1.3 (34.3)	6.3 (43.3)	9.5 (49.1)	11.2 (52.2)	11.2 (52.2)	8.2 (46.8)	4.5 (40.1)	−0.9 (30.4)	−3.9 (25.0)	2.9 (37.2)
Mean daily minimum °C (°F)	−7.3 (18.9)	−7.1 (19.2)	−4.7 (23.5)	−1.3 (29.7)	3.2 (37.8)	6.5 (43.7)	8.2 (46.8)	8.3 (46.9)	5.6 (42.1)	2.1 (35.8)	−2.9 (26.8)	−6.1 (21.0)	0.4 (32.7)
Average precipitation mm (inches)	88 (3.5)	80 (3.1)	87 (3.4)	86 (3.4)	101 (4.0)	109 (4.3)	112 (4.4)	106 (4.2)	89 (3.5)	70 (2.8)	88 (3.5)	102 (4.0)	1,118 (44.0)
Average precipitation days (≥ 1.0 mm)	15	14	14	13	13	14	13	12	12	10	14	16	160
Mean monthly sunshine hours	63.8	76.7	104.1	139.0	176.5	180.7	191.8	189.7	145.1	130.3	60.6	57.4	1,515.7
Source: NOAA

== Summit ==
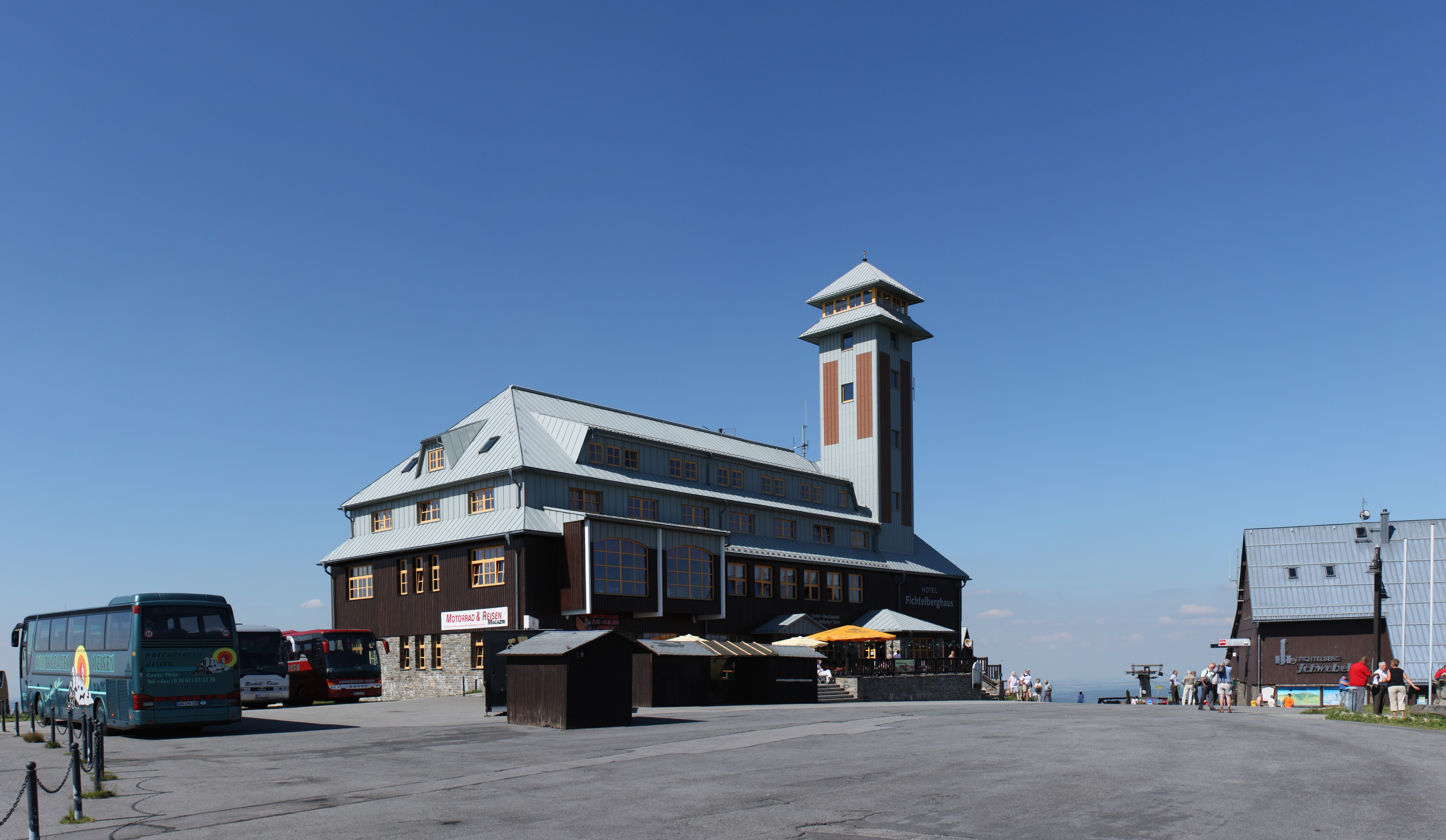
Summit of the Fichtelberg in summer 2010. The Fichtelberg House with tourist buses in front. Right: top station of the Fichtelberg Cable Car.

On the summit of the Fichtelberg stands the Fichtelberg House (Fichtelberghaus) with its observation tower, a weather station and a prominent triangulation station of the Royal Saxon Survey (Königlich-Sächsischen Triangulation) from 1864, where measurements of regional and national significance were carried out. The Fichtelberg Cable Car runs up the eastern slope of the mountain from Oberwiesenthal to a point near the summit.

== History ==
=== Origin of the name ===
The mountain was given its name thanks to the existing natural forests of spruce that covered it (see section on forest history). In the 16th century Georgius Agricola used the Latinised form, Pinifer (Fichtelberg).

=== Fichtelberg House ===
The first albeit unreferenced evidence of a building on the summit of the Fichtelberg is found in the Historischen Schauplatz published in 1699 by Christian Lehmann, where it says:

"They certainly say / that a hundred years ago a summer house and hunting lodge / built by the Schönburg lords / were supposedly on top of it / but now there is no longer anything to be found / because it may have given little enjoyment / even a rifle shot and thunderclap up there makes a poor noise / being swallowed up by the air so to speak."

"Man erzehlet zwar / daß vor hundert Jahren ein Lust- und Jagthaus / von den Schönburgischen Herren erbauet / darauf soll gestanden seyn / aber nunmehro ist nichts mehr darauf zu finden / weil es mag wenig Ergötzlichkeit gegeben haben / auch ein Büchsenschuß und Donnerschlag darauf schlechten Knall giebet / sondern von der Lufft gleichsam verschlungen wird."

The first definitely confirmed Fichtelberg house was built on the Fichtelberg in 1888/89 by Oskar Puschmann. It was opened on 21 July 1889 and extended for the first time in 1899. In 1910 the house was expanded again as a result of the popularity of the highest mountain in Saxony. With the construction of the Fichtelberg Cable Car in 1924 the visitor numbers climbed still further.

On the evening of 25 February 1963 a fire broke out in the Fichtelberg House. 180 firemen from across the county of Annaberg were called out and took part in the firefighting. Heavy snowdrifts on the access road meant that all the firefighting equipment had to be transported up the mountain on the cable car. Hoses that had been laid from Oberwiesenthal up to the top of the mountain froze in temperatures of −15 °C and the lack of water meant that they could not put the fire out. The building was razed to its foundation walls.

On 22 June 1965 the foundation stone for a new building was laid. By 1967, a modern Fichtelberg House with an austere, typically East German concrete architecture and integrated, plain, 42 metre-high observation tower had been completed. The GDR made 12 million marks available for its construction. The new Fichtelberg House had seating for around 600. On the ground floor was a large self-service restaurant, on the upper floor was a grill bar, a concert café and a conference room. Well known artists helped design the interior. The wooden walls of the vestibule and the room dividers in the self-service area were by Hans Brockhage. Carl-Heinz Westenburger created a mural for the end wall of the conference room, on which he depicted sporting life on the Fichtelberg. At the end of the 1990 the Fichtelberg House was converted to resemble the old building and re-opened on 18 July 1999. The newly built observation tower is only 31 metres high.

=== Weather station ===
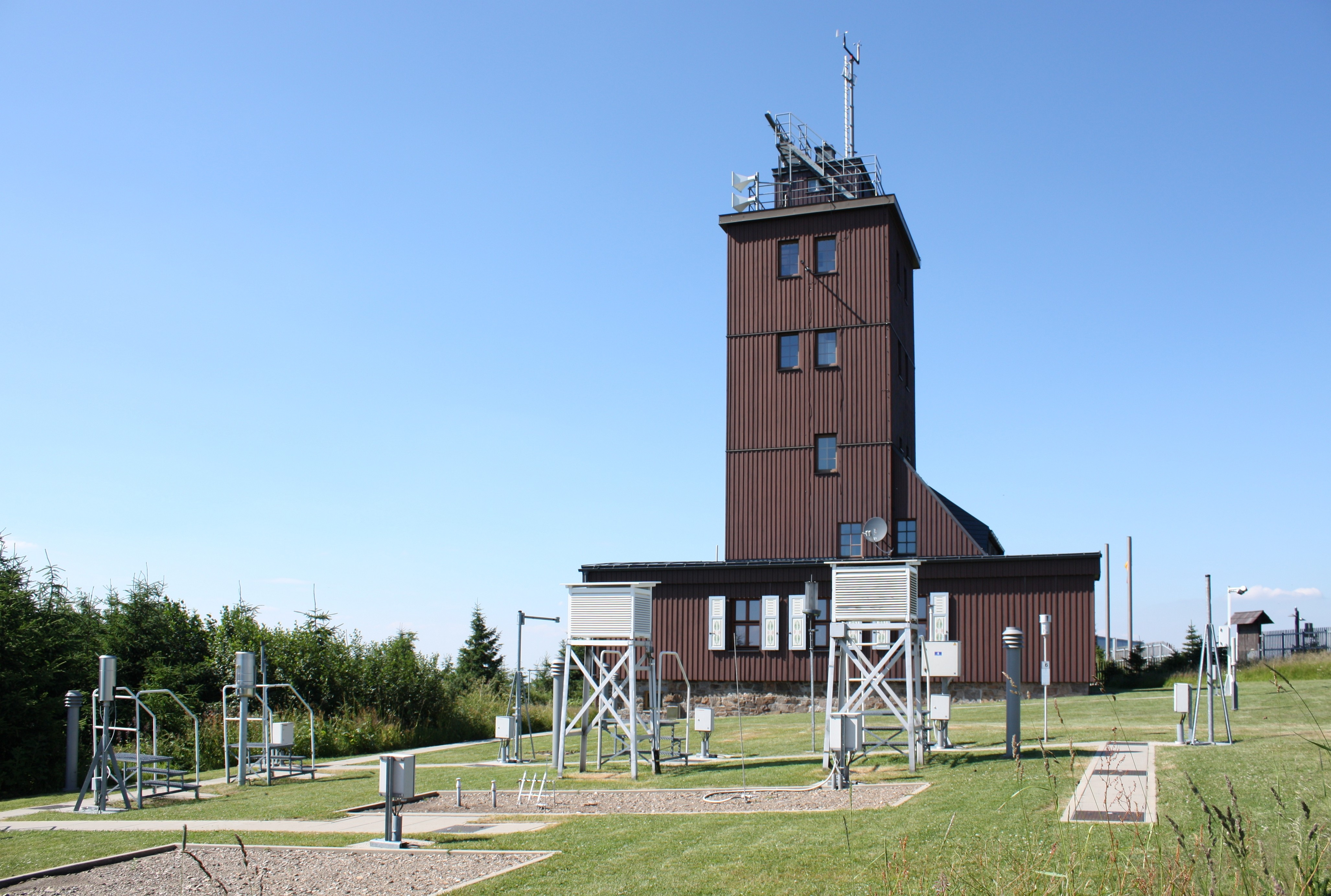
Weather station with meteorological instruments

In 1890 the publican of the Fichtelberg House recorded the first regular weather observations. On 1 January 1916 meteorologists began work in the new weather station. It was founded by Paul Schreiber and expanded into a mountain observatory in 1950. In 2019, measurements at the top were fully automated and the station is no longer staffed.

=== Cable car ===
The Fichtelberg rises above the holiday and winter sports resort of Oberwiesenthal, both connected by the Fichtelberg Cable Car (Fichtelberg-Schwebebahn). This cable car was opened in 1924, the cable is 1,175 m long with a height difference of 305 m. It takes six minutes to travel from the valley to the top of the mountain. Large car parks are available on the lower half of the mountain, but parking near the top is limited. Bus transportation is available in addition to the cable car.

=== Fichtelberg Railway ===
The Fichtelberg Railway (Fichtelbergbahn) terminates at the southeastern foot of the mountain. This narrow gauge line, which runs from Cranzahl to Oberwiesenthal, was opened in 1897 and is 17.349 km long.

=== Fichtelberg Inn ===
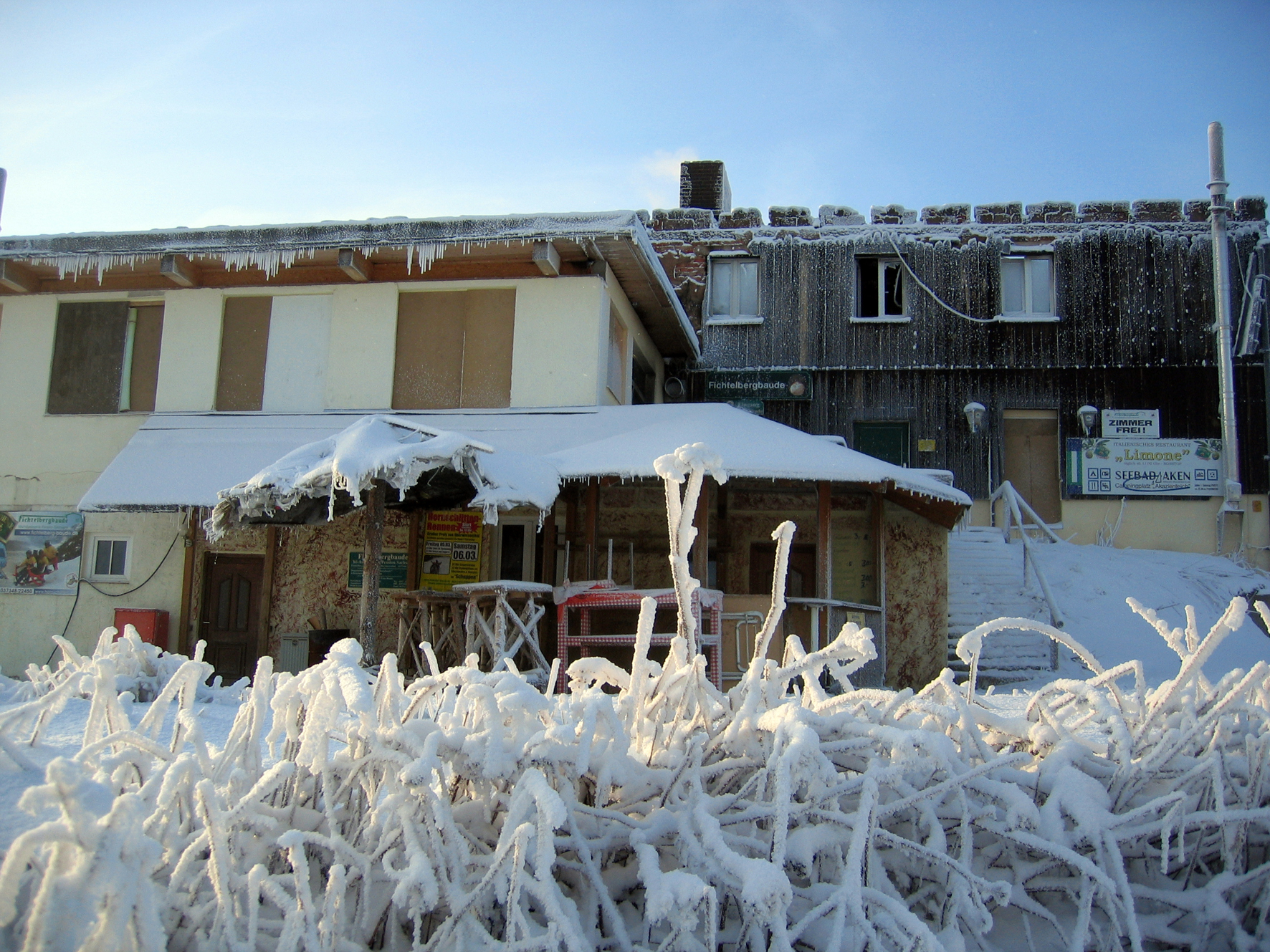
The burnt out Fichtelberg Inn on 12 December 2009

The Fichtelberg Inn (Fichtelbergbaude), a building used as a guest house on the road leading up the Fichtelberg, caught fire on 21 November 2009 in a suspected arson attack.

== Flora and fauna ==
=== Forest history ===
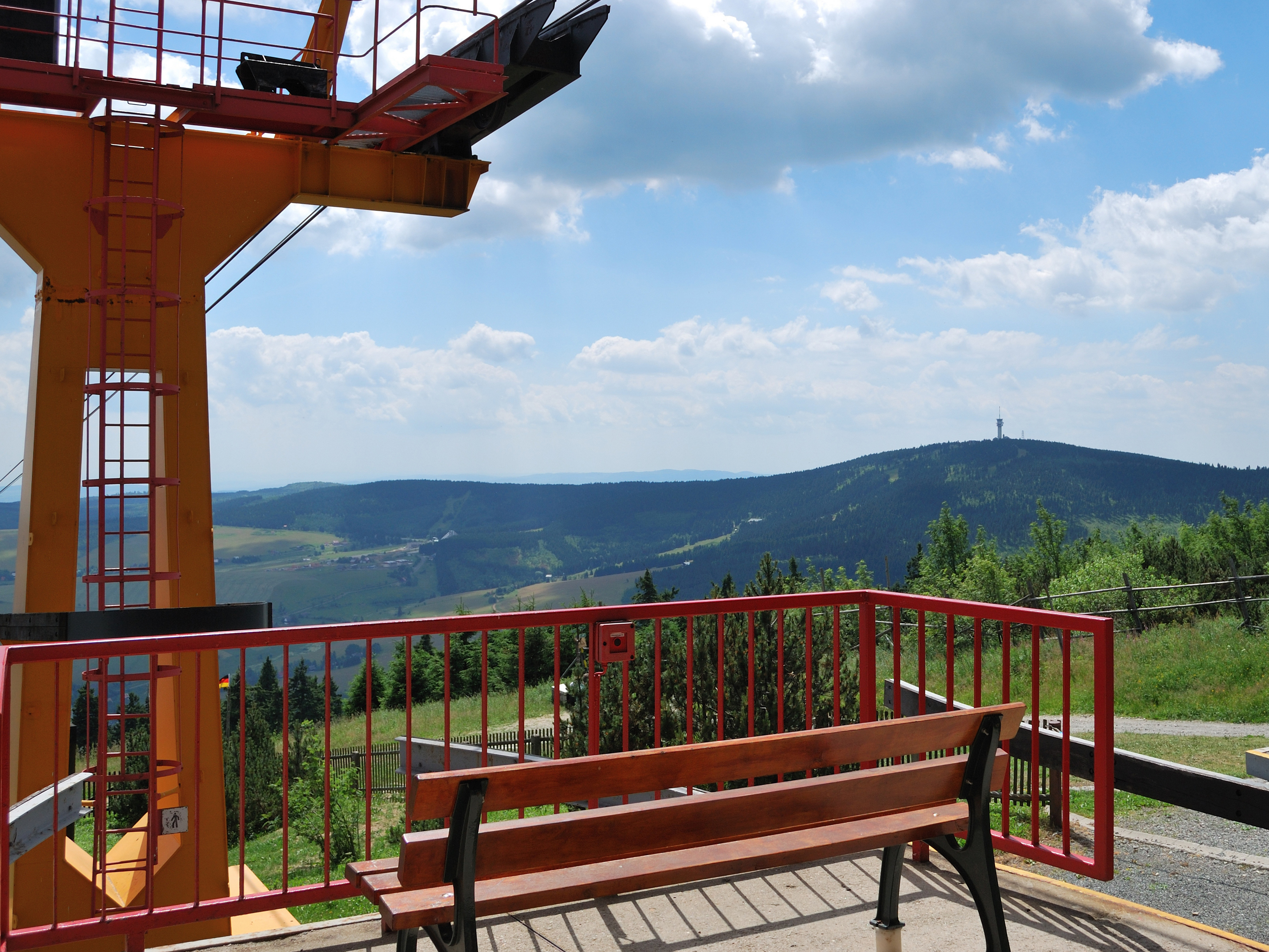
View from the top station of the Keilberg on the Czech side of the border

The extensive spruce forests in the area surrounding the Fichtelberg have been constantly utilised since man first settled here and have thus undergone much change. The original vegetation of the highlands and mountain ridges was fundamentally different. Pollen analyses from the Gottesgaber Moor revealed useful information about the former composition of the forest. The main tree species of the Hercynian mixed forest of the highlands - the silver fir (Abies alba), European beech (Fagus sylvatica) and Norway spruce (Picea abies) - occurred in roughly equal proportions of around 30% on the ridgelines. Old church records and forest assessments contain descriptions of the original condition of the forest, showing that the Fichtelberg was covered by mixed forest consisting of the aforementioned tree species. The present dominance of the spruce is primarily a result of human influence. Improper management such as deforestation and high populations of game steadily reduced the proportion of fir and beech trees in favour of spruce. With the beginning of state forestry in Saxony in the early 19th century, the composition of species changed drastically. Forest management, which was focussed on achieving the highest net yield, saw the spruce as the perfect timber resource. Gradually other tree species were planted again.

=== Botanical specialities ===
The exposed situations of the Fichtelberg near the natural treeline provides a good habitat for many rare montane plants. Of particular note is the occurrence of numerous species that are normally found in the Alps or the Tundra of Northern Europe, including the small white orchid, common moonwort, frog orchid, Alpine clubmoss und Alpine coltsfoot.

=== Protected areas ===
The following protected areas are found on the Fichtelberg:

- The Fichtelberg Protected Area, established in 1962 and covering 5.48 km^{2} (LSG No. 320795)
- The Fichtelberg and Schönjungfern Valley (Fichtelberg mit Schönjungferngrund) Nature Reserve, on the southern slopes was established in 1961 and covers 18.67 ha in two separate areas (NSG No. 163092)
- The Fichtelberg South Mountainside (Fichtelberg-Südhang) Nature Reserve to the southwest of the Fichtelberg and Schönjungfern Valley reserve, established in 1997, which comprises a number of separate areas covering 73.15 ha (NSG No. 163093).
- The Cane or Reed Meadow (Rohr- oder Schilfwiese) to the west on the Kleiner Fichtelberg formed in 1967 and covering 5.25 ha (NSG No. 165205).

These areas overlap with the Fichtelberg Meadows (Fichtelbergwiesen) Habitat Area (FFH No. 5543-304).

== Views ==
On clear days, one can see to the mountains in the northern Czech Republic (the Central Bohemian Uplands, Lusatian Mountains, Jizera Mountains and Giant Mountains) and to the Bohemian Forest to the south. The area around Fichtelberg and the neighbouring Klínovec mountain is famous for winter sport facilities, providing many ski lifts and cross-country ski tracks.

== Ascents ==
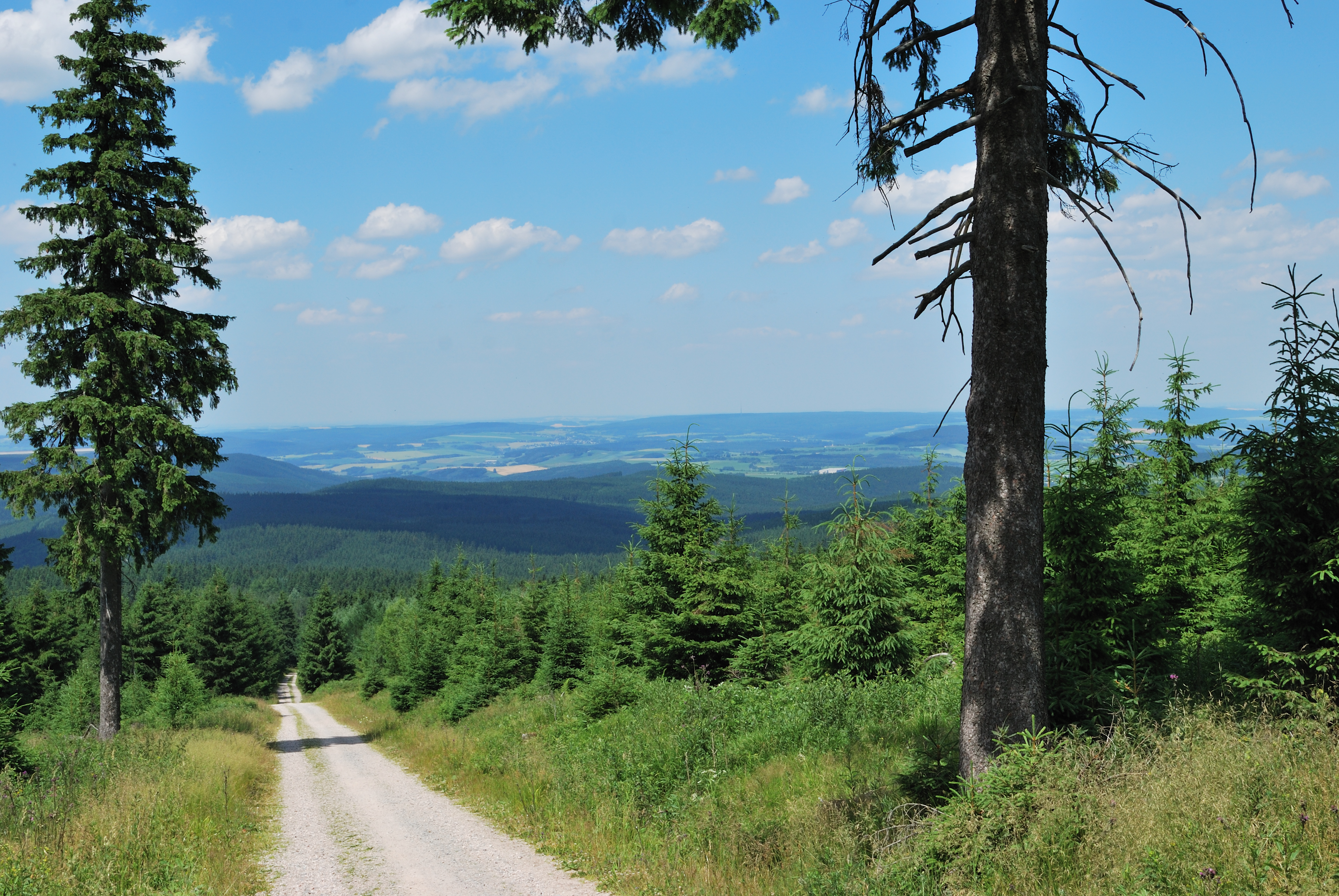
View looking north to Crottendorf

The journey time to the top of the mountain on the Fichtelberg Cable Car is 3½ minutes. There is also a bus service from Oberwiesenthal. At the summit and just below it are several parking areas for cars and busses. The mountain is also accessible on numerous footpaths. Some are part of the E3 European long distance path and the Zittau to Wernigerode long distance path.

The mountain is a magnet for cyclists and bikers. From the Pöhlbach valley, two long winding roads, starting at a height of 830 m, head towards the Czech border. After a short section on the level, it turns right towards the summit. The road runs through forested countryside that gives a strong impression that one is above 1,000 m. The total length of this ascent is 6,600 metres and it climbs through around 380 metres in height.

The less well known and more difficult ascent starts in Rittersgrün and climbs through 556 metres in 13.64 kilometres. The road runs through Ehrenzipfel, Zweibach and Tellerhäuser. After passing through these villages there is a long steep climb that flattens out as it makes its way up to a junction signed Fichtelberg. After a further 2 kilometres of uphill climbing it reaches the summit of the Fichtelberg.

== Gallery ==
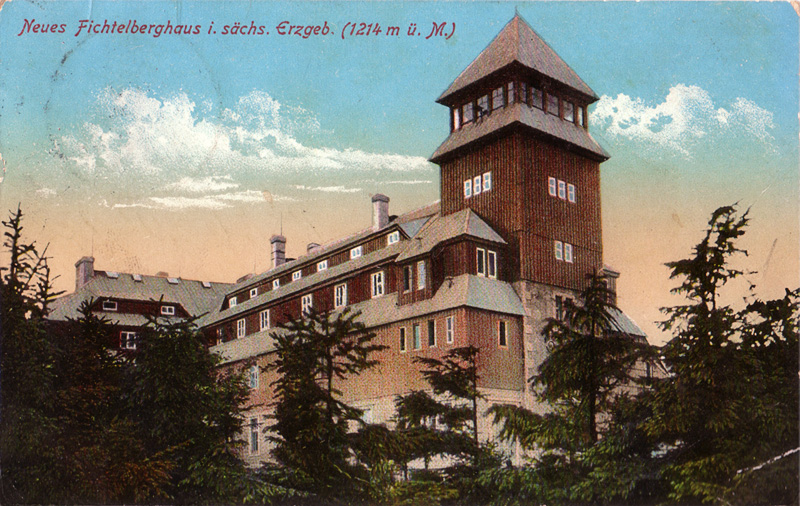
Fichtelberghaus after the expansion in 1912

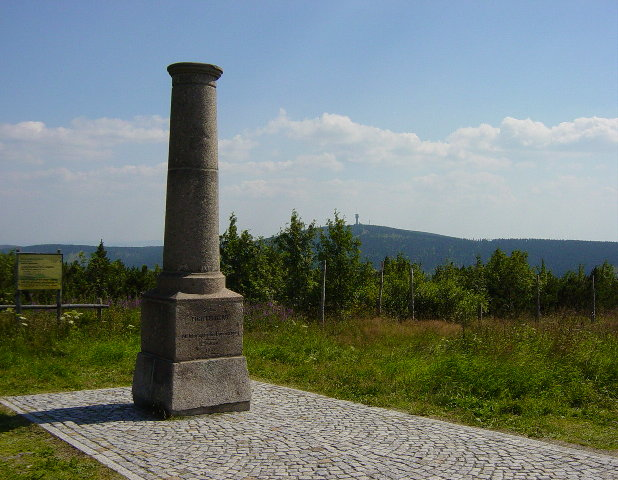
meridian fixed point from 1864 in foreground, Klínovec in background

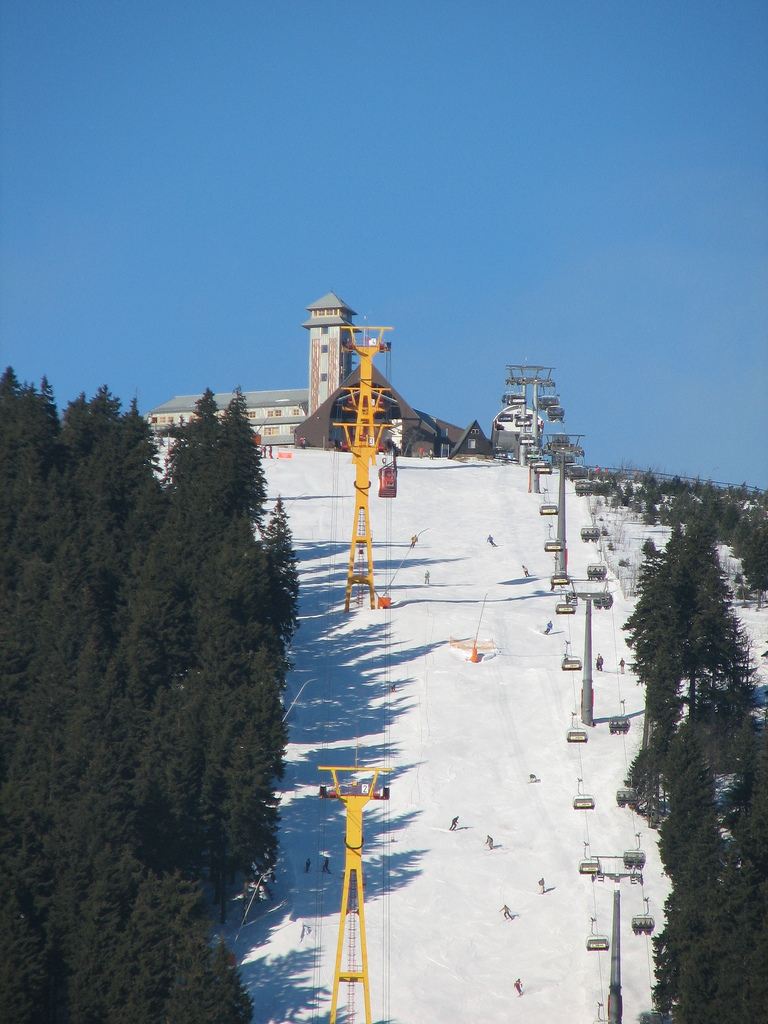
The Fichtelberg Aerial Tramway ascending to the peak

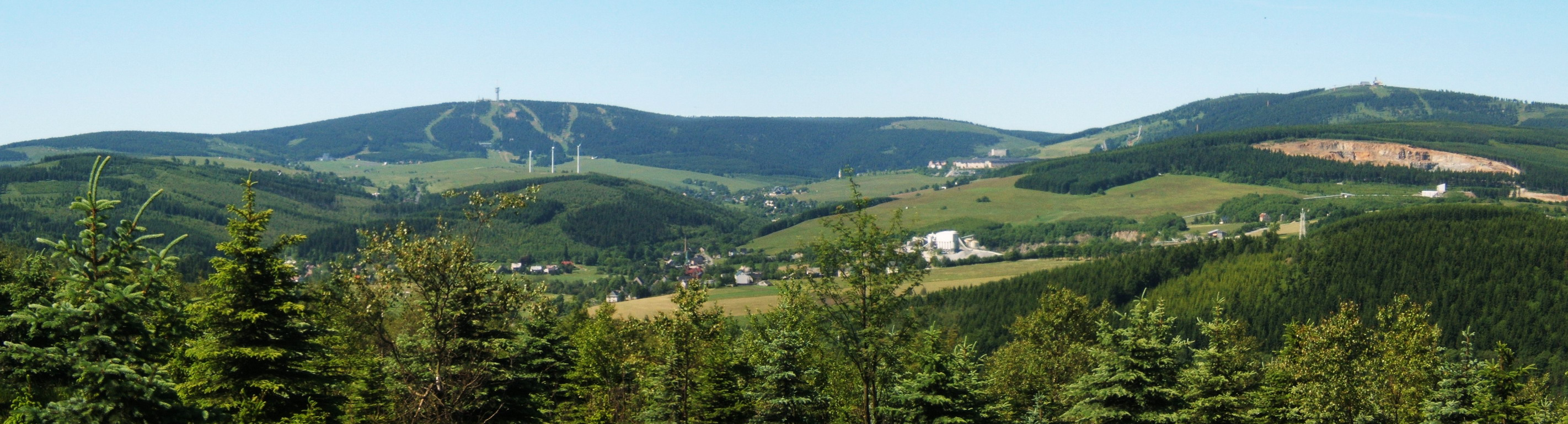
Panorama view from the mountain Hoher Stein to Oberwiesenthal with the Fichtelberg (on the right) and the Klínovec mountain (on the left).

== See also ==
- List of mountains in the Ore Mountains

== Literature ==
- Von Annaberg bis Oberwiesenthal. Edition no. 1 Akademie-Verlag Berlin, Berlin 1968 (Werte der deutschen Heimat. Vol. 13).
- Reinhart Heppner/Jörg Brückner/Helmut Schmidt: Sächsisch-böhmische Aussichtsberge des westlichen Erzgebirges in Wort und Bild mit touristischen Angaben, Horb am Neckar, 2001, pp. 52–54
