= Velký Špičák =

Mountain in Czech Republic

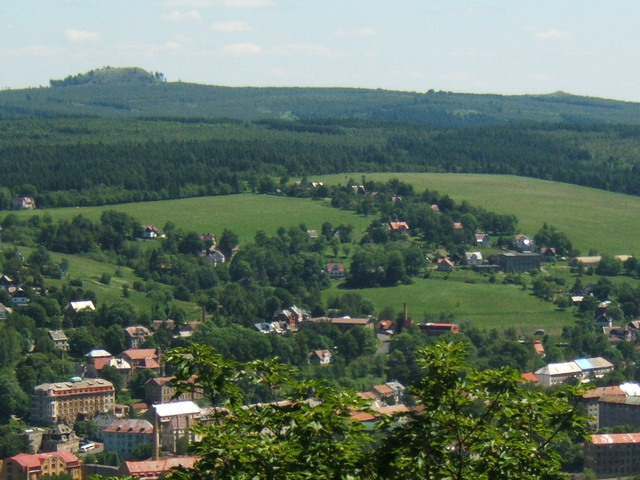
- Velký Špičák, seen from the Bärenstein

Highest point
- Elevation: 965 m (3,166 ft)
- Coordinates: 50°27′40″N 13°05′12″E

Geography
- Location within Czech Republic
- Location: Ústecký kraj, Czech Republic
- Parent range: Ore Mountains

Geology
- Mountain type: basalt

Velký Špičák (German: Großer Spitzberg or Schmiedeberger Spitzberg) is a 965 m high mountain in the Czech part of the Ore Mountains of Central Europe.
