= Klínovec =

Peak of the Ore Mountains in the Czech Republic

- Keilberg
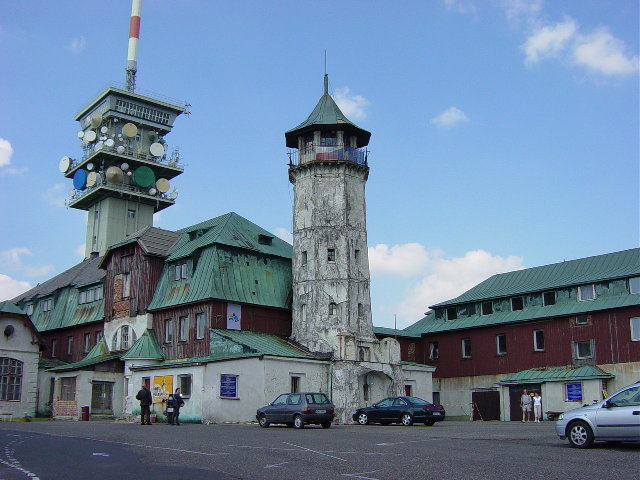
- Former mountain hotel on Klínovec, broadcast tower in the background

Highest point
- Elevation: 1,244 m (4,081 ft)
- Prominence: 748 m (2,454 ft)
- Isolation: 133.1 km (82.7 mi) to Großer Osser
- Coordinates: 50°23′46″N 12°58′04″E

Geography
- Location within Czech Republic
- Location: Czech Republic
- Parent range: Ore Mountains

Climbing
- Easiest route: road, tourist trails, chairlift

Klínovec (German: Keilberg) is the highest peak of the Ore Mountains, located in the Czech Republic's part of the mountains at 1,244 metres (4,081 ft). There is an 80 m TV broadcasting tower on the top of the mountain and a 24 meter high lookout tower. From the south side, the Jáchymov - Klínovec chairlift leads to the top (length 2,168 m and elevation 480 m), from the north side leads another chairlift Dámská (length 1,210 m and elevation 232 m).

== Location ==
Klínovec lies in northern Bohemia, on the border between the Karlovy Vary and Ústí nad Labem regions. The summit and western slopes are located in the municipal territory of Jáchymov, about 5 km (3 mi) northeast of the town; the eastern slopes belongs to Loučná pod Klínovcem. The summit is located about 1.7 km (1.1 mi) southeast of the Czech–German border. Access to the peak is provided by a road from Boží Dar, tourist trails (marked red and yellow), or a chairlift from Jáchymov, running all year round. These days, Klínovec is a popular regional ski resort, featuring more than 10 km (6.2 mi) of ski pistes, 35 km (22 mi) of trails for cross-country skiing and a snowpark.

== Climate ==
The average temperature at the peak is 2.7 °C (36.9 °F), the average rainfall amounts to 1,050 mm (41 in).

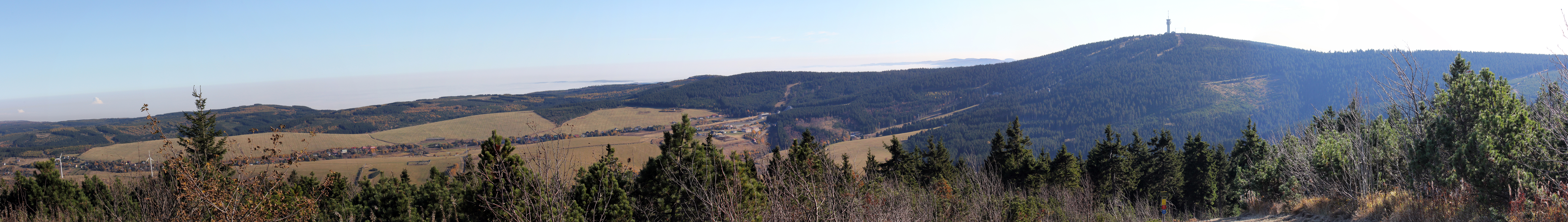
Panorama vista of the Klínovec mountain (Czech Republic), seen from the top of the Fichtelberg mountain (Germany)

== History ==
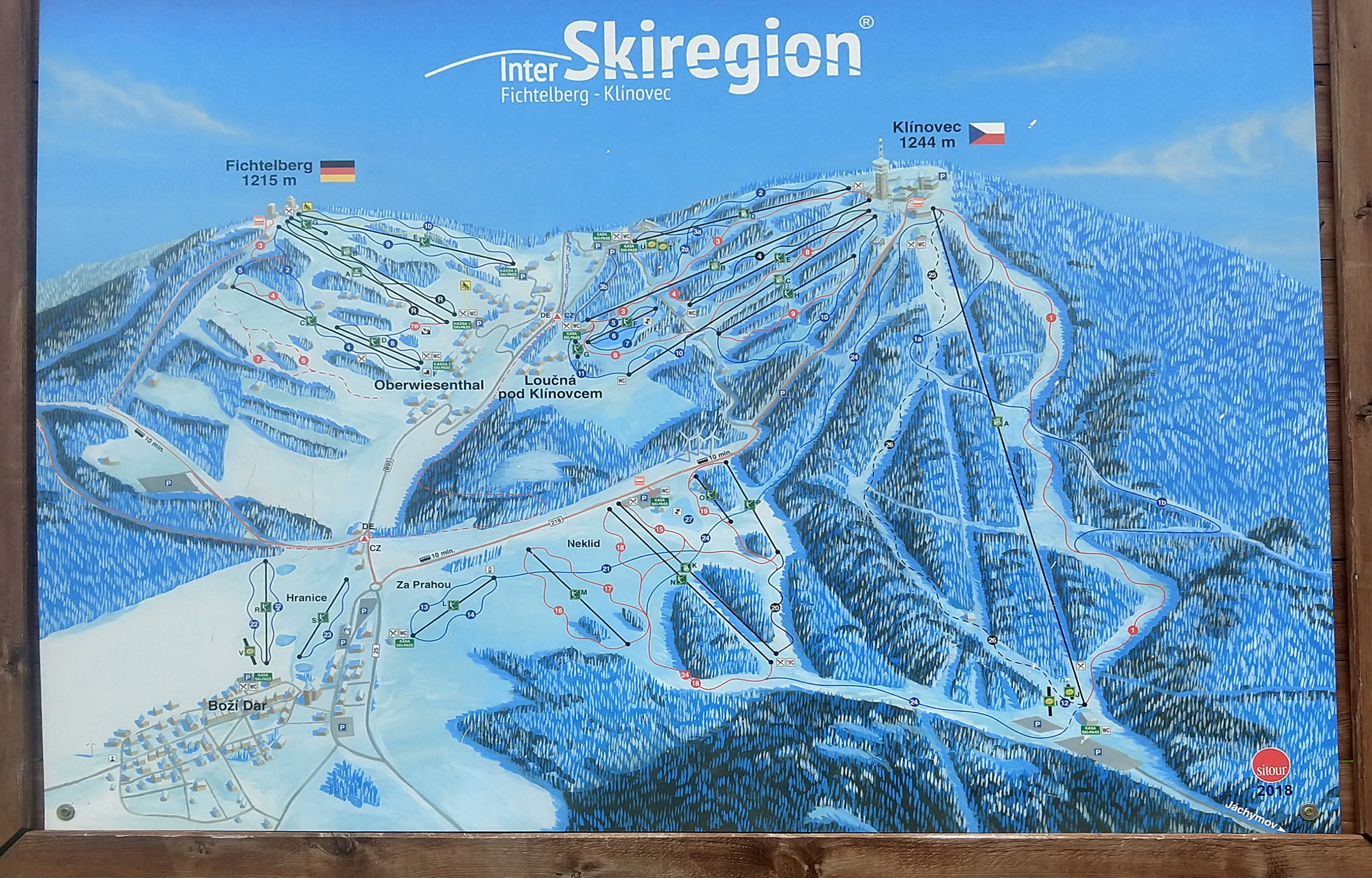
Trail map of Ski Resort Klínovec

Due to its elevation, Klínovec offers a panoramic view of Bohemia and Saxony. On a clear day, the Upper Palatine Forest may be seen to the south, 150 kilometres (93 miles) away, or the Ještěd mountain to the east.

The first public observation tower was built on the summit as early as 1817, and instantly became popular among visitors of the famous spa of Karlsbad (Czech: Karlovy Vary). However, the wooden tower burnt down in 1868, and a new stone one was built between the years 1883 and 1884. This tower bore the name Kaiser-Franz-Josephs-Turm ("Emperor Franz Joseph Tower") and has survived until the present.

The tower is 24 metres (79 ft) high and was extended with a hotel in 1893, when its popularity grew to such an extent, that accommodation was needed. The complex has been further extended over time, but it is currently in poor condition. Attempts to restore the buildings have been delayed through a lack of funds, although work was due to start in 2012.

In addition, a 56 metres (184 ft) high broadcasting tower was erected on the top of Klínovec in the 1950s, exceeding the height of the observation tower by 32 metres (105 ft). The Klínovec TV tower covers most of the Karlovy Vary and Ústí nad Labem regions and broadcasts in digital.

== Gallery ==
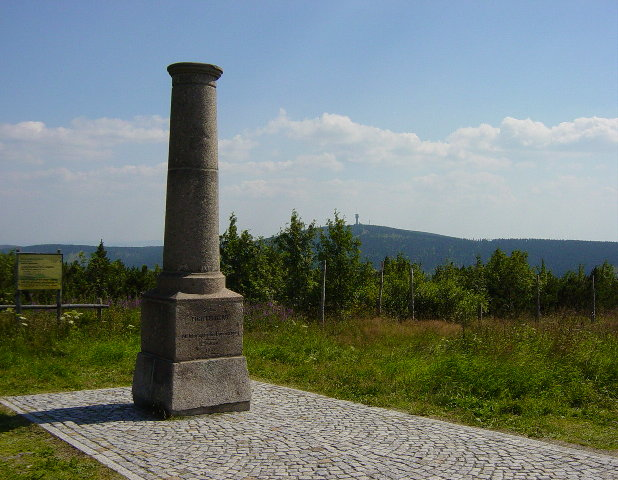
View of Klínovec from Fichtelberg (meridian a 1864 fixed point from at the front)

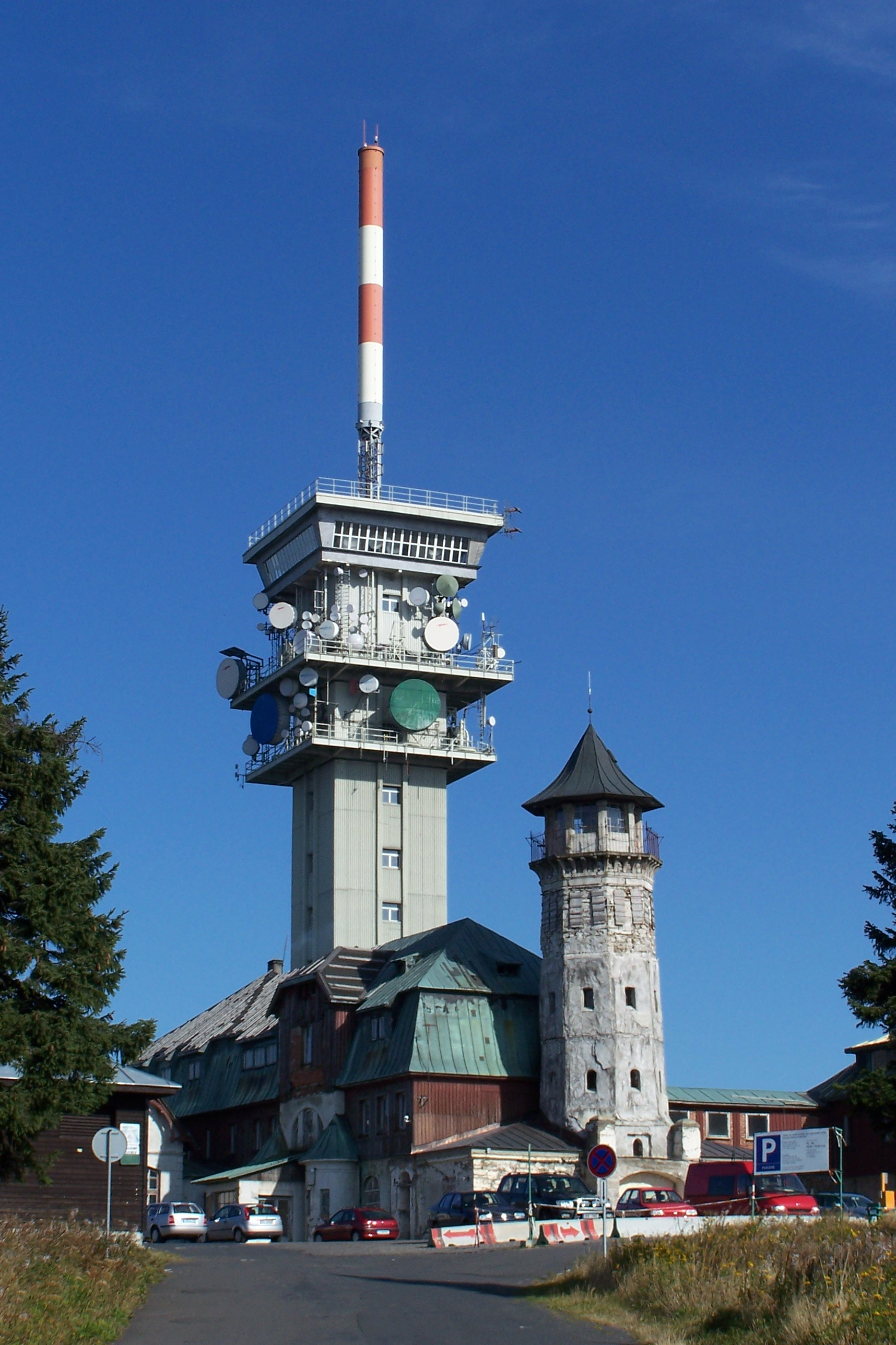
Klínovec broadcast tower and the smaller observation tower

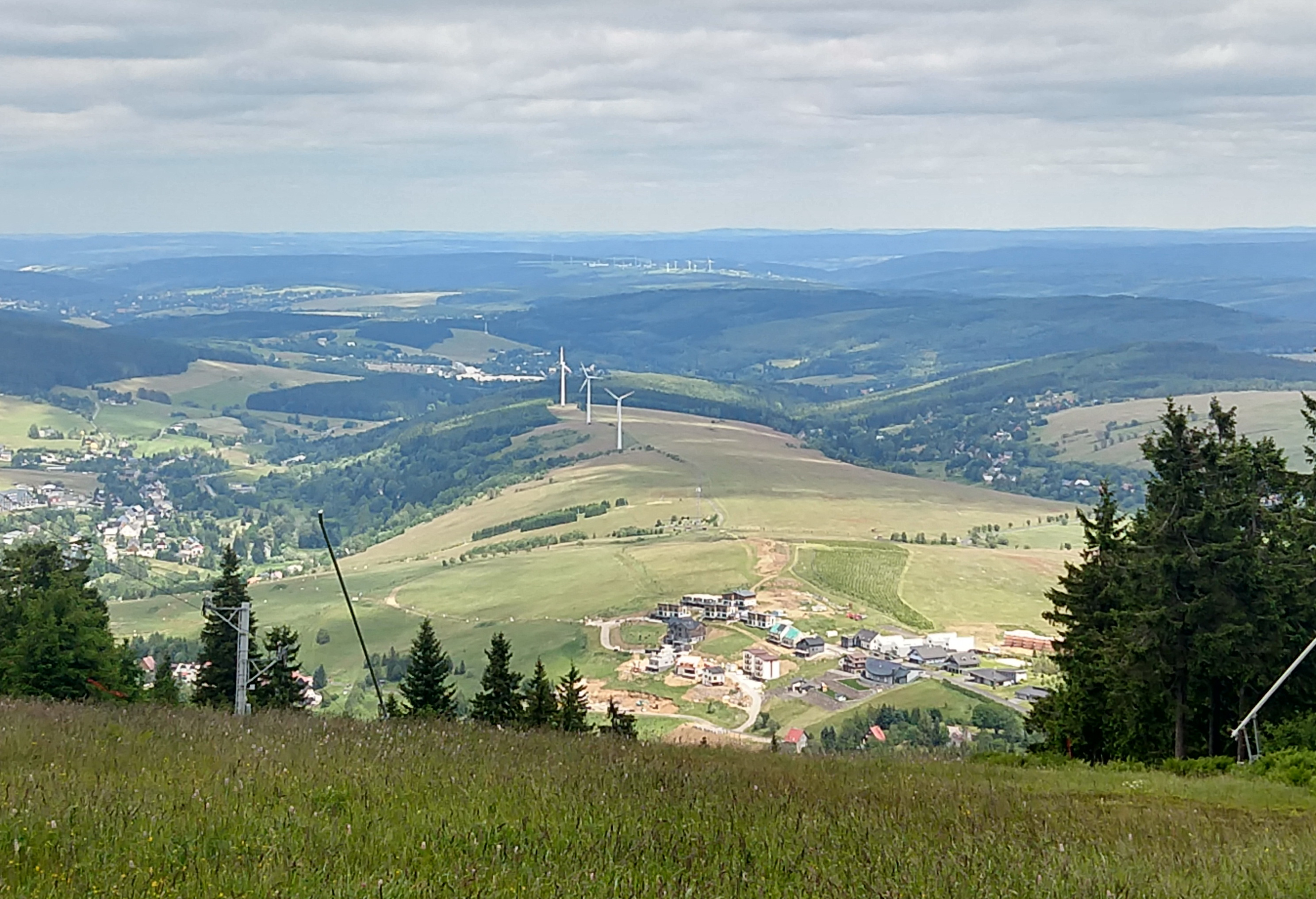
View from Klínovec

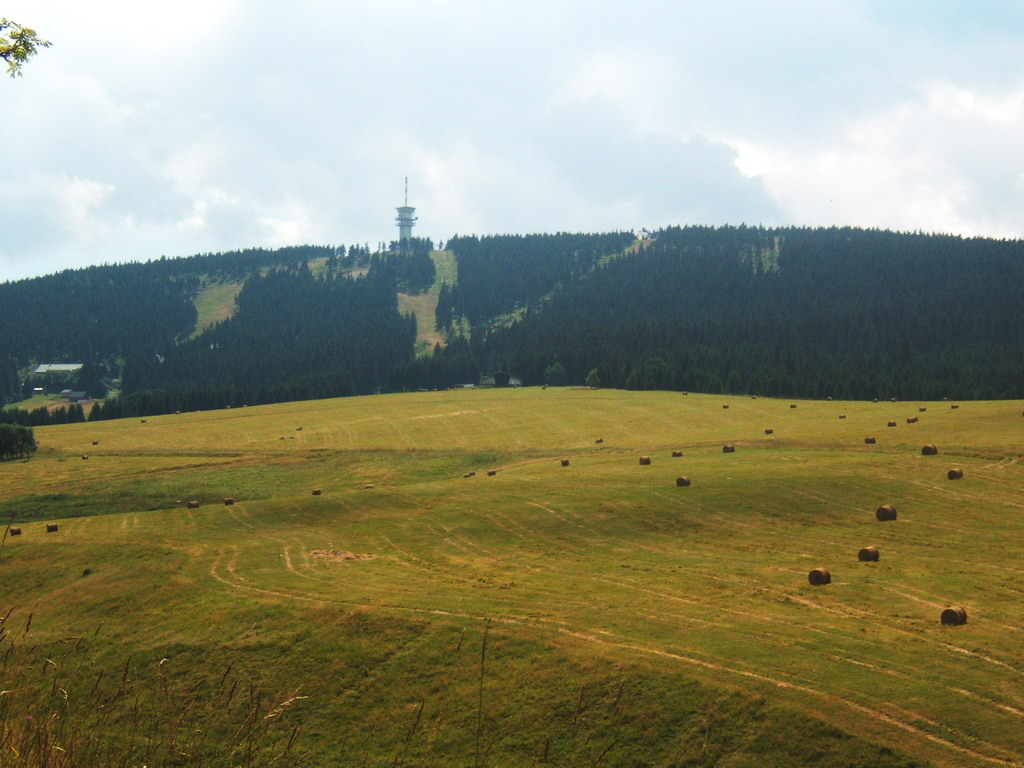
Ski pistes at Klínovec

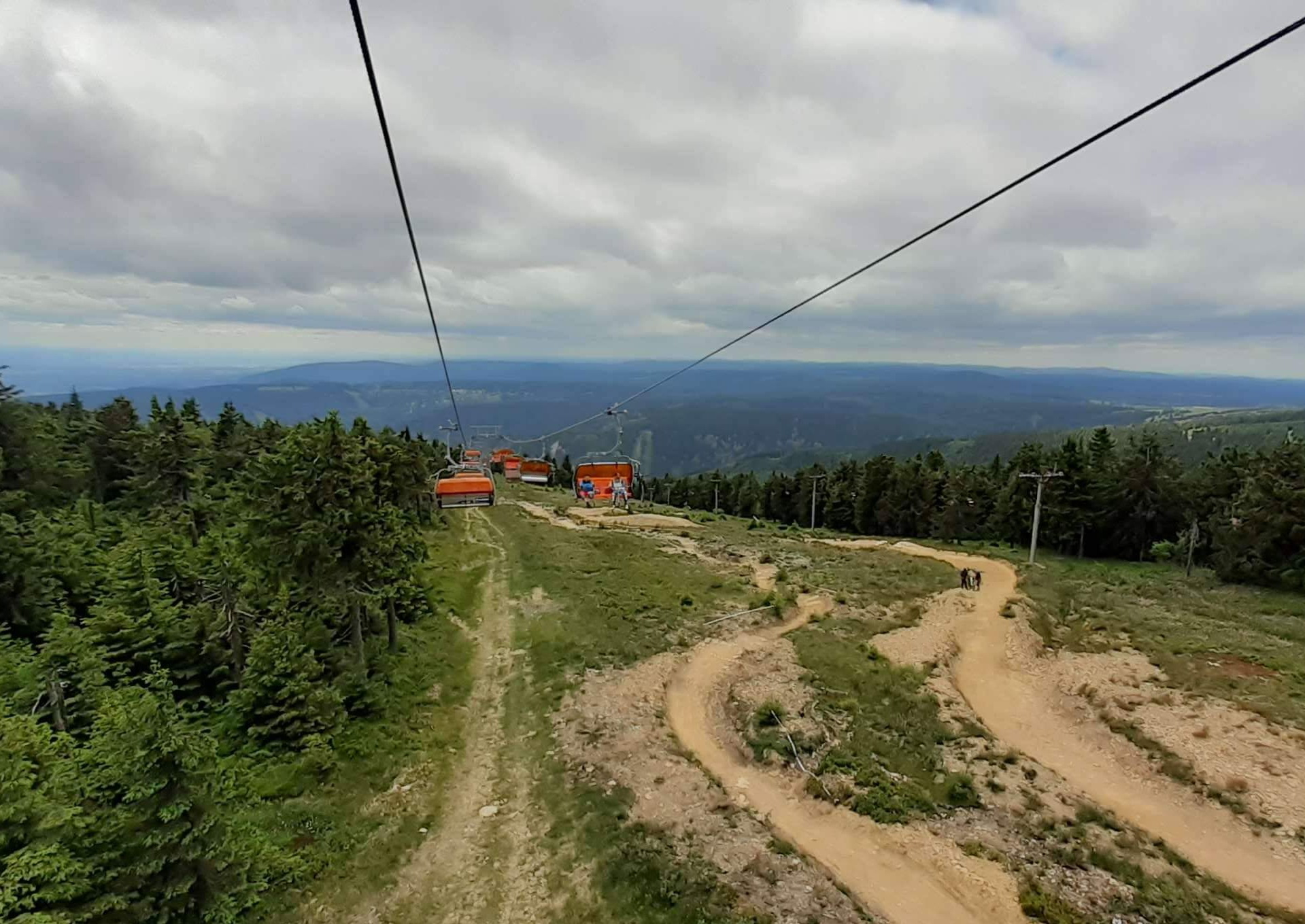
Chair lift to Klínovec

== See also ==
- List of mountains in the Ore Mountains
