= Pöhlberg =

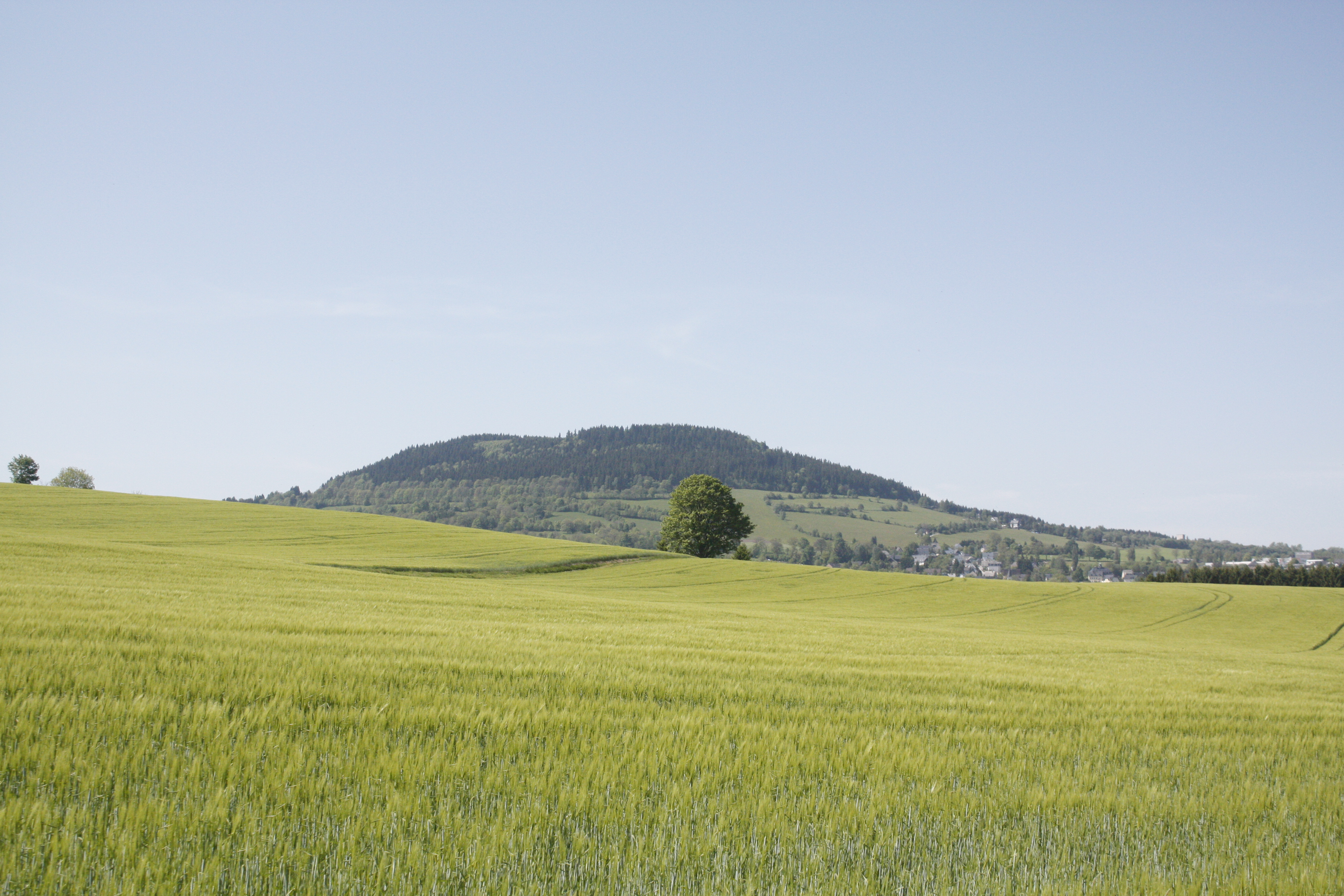
- Pöhlberg

Highest point
- Elevation: 834 m (2,736 ft)
- Coordinates: 50°34′28″N 13°01′52″E

Geography
- Location: Saxony, Germany

Pöhlberg is a basalt table mountain of Saxony, southeastern Germany, standing at approximately 831 m above sea level. Located immediately east of Annaberg-Buchholz, with the western slope adjacent to the historic mining town.

== Mining Landscape ==
The Pöhlberg Mining Landscape, situated on the mountain's eastern slope in a rural area adjacent to Annaberg, is a notable component of the Ore Mountain Mining Region (Erzgebirge/Krušnohoří), a UNESCO World Heritage Site.

Mining activity in the Pöhlberg area dates back to the late Middle Ages. The introduction of the Saigerverfahren (liquation process) around 1471, attributed to Nickel Tyle in Chemnitz, enabled the extraction of silver from copper ores. This innovation significantly boosted mining operations on Pöhlberg and contributed substantially to Saxon silver production by 1537. The entrepreneurial Uthmann family, particularly Christoph Uthmann, played a central role in developing the mines on Pöhlberg’s eastern side. Christoph operated the St. Briccius copper mine and, in 1550, acquired the Saigerhütte Grünthal (liquation works), using a special privilege to purchase copper ore at fixed prices. The ores from Pöhlberg were transported approximately 30 km to Grünthal for processing. In 1567, the Saxon Elector acquired the liquation works to centralize control over silver and copper output. It remained under state ownership until 1873, when it was privatized as the Saxon Copper and Brass Works.

Today, remnants of historical mining infrastructure can still be found across the landscape, including waste heaps, adit entrances, and the mine administration building (Huthaus) at St. Briccius. Underground, preserved sections of horizontal and vertical workings, original wooden supports, and elements of drainage and ventilation systems reflect mining activity from the 15th to the 18th centuries.

== See also ==
- Ore Mountains
