= Bärenstein (Ore Mountains) =

Mountain in Saxony, Germany

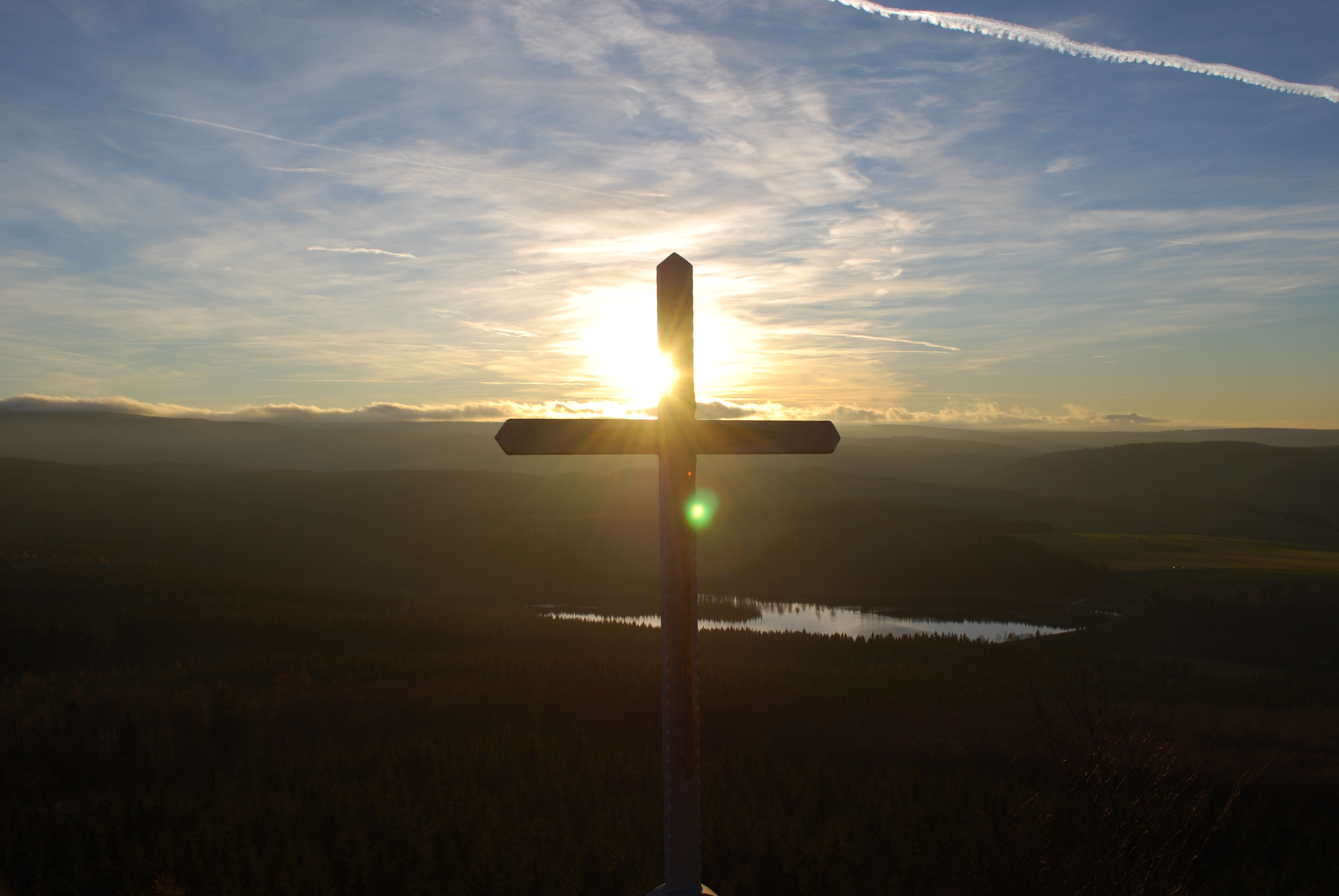

Highest point
- Elevation: 898 m (2,946 ft)
- Prominence: 142 m (466 ft)
- Coordinates: 50°30′29″N 13°1′9″E

Geography
- Location: Saxony, Germany
- Parent range: Ore Mountains

Bärenstein is an 898 m (2,946 ft) peak in the Ore Mountains, located south of Annaberg-Buchholz in Saxony, southeastern Germany. An abandoned basalt quarry lies on the mountain's northern slope.
