= Chernobog and Belobog =

Disputed Slavic deities

Chernobog (Note: Also transcribed as Černobog.) (lit. "Black God") and Belobog (Note: Also transcribed as Belebog, Belbog.) (lit. "White God") are a pair of opposing deities alleged to be part of Polabian mythology.

The first written account of Chernobog is in the 12th-century Chronicle of the Slavs, where he is described as a god of misfortune worshipped by the Wagri and Obodrites; while Belobog is first noted in 16th century literature in opposition to Chernobog. Researchers disagree on whether the two deities were indeed part of Slavic folklore: while many scholars believe the two theonyms are authentic, others believe they are pseudo-deities. Both deities appear in later sources, however, with Chernobog being associated with the Christian devil.

== Sources ==
In Latin records, this theonym is noted as Zcerneboch and zcerneboth.

The 12th-century German monk and chronicler Helmold, who accompanied the Christianization missions to the Elbe Slavs, describes in his Chronicle of the Slavs the cult of Chernobog:

Also, the Slavs have a strange delusion. At their feasts and carousals, they pass about a bowl over which they utter words, I should not say of consecration but of execration, in the name of [two] gods — of the good one, as well as of the bad one — professing that all propitious fortune is arranged by the good god, adverse, by the bad god. Hence, also, in their language, they call the bad god Diabol, or Zcerneboch, that is, the black god.

Belobog does not appear in any reliable sources – he was created in opposition to Chernobog.

=== Later sources ===
The next sources that speak of Chernobog and/or Belobog appear only in the 16th century. Around 1530, a Dominican friar from Pirna, Johan Lindner, recalls the gods in his compilation. Although he lived in or near the Lusatian region, he probably only used written sources and monastic stories, and not field research, which made many historians deem his work unreliable, including Georg Fabricius and Petrus Albinus. They believed that although his sources were numerous and varied, he used them uncritically. At the end of the 17th century, Abraham Frencel also mentioned the Chernobog in his list of the Lusatian gods. This information is also considered unreliable because it came into being late, when the Lusatian paganism was probably completely extinct and about half of the gods he mentioned are of Prussian origin.

In 1538, the Pomeranian chronicler Thomas Kantzow in his Chronicle of Pomerania wrote:

I have heretofore related all manner of faithlessness and idolatry, in which they had engaged before the time of the German Empire. Earlier yet, their ways are said to have been even more pagan. They placed their kings and lords, who ruled well, above the gods and honored the said men [as gods] after their death. In addition, they worshipped the sun and the moon and, lastly, two gods whom they venerated above all other gods. One [of them] they called Bialbug, that is the white god; him they held for a good god. The other one [they called] Zernebug, that is the black god; him they held for a god who did harm. Therefore, they honored Bialbug, because he did them good and so that he might [continue to] do them good. Zernebug, on the other hand, they honored so that he should not harm them. And they appeased the said Zernebug by sacrificing people, for they believed that there was no better way of assuaging him than with human blood, which is actually true, if only they had seen it in the right light: that Zernebug seeks nothing other than the death of Man's body and soul.

Then Sebastian Münster, in Cosmographiae universalis of 1550, describes the harvest ritual associated with Svetovit and continues: "In general they (the Rugians) worshipped two gods, namely Belbuck and Zernebuck, as if a white and a black god, a good and an evil genius, God and Satan, as the source of good and evil, according to the error of the Manichaeans". The works of Kantzov and Münster are probably independent of each other (various forms of recording the name of the Belobog, the Chronicle of Pomerania was first published, but it was not published until the 19th century), but they use a common source, which, according to Miroslava Znayenko, could be the archive of the Abbey of Białoboki, where the Belobog was forged. Daniel Cramer, a theologian and professor from Szczecin, probably held in his hands a copy of a chronicle from this archive or saw a quote from it, because in his Pommerisches Kirchen-Chronicon he probably paraphrased a part of it:

To this monastery they (the founding monks) gave the name Belbug, [more] correctly Bialbuck, which in the Wendish tongue means literally ‘the white god,’ thus to give [the Slavs] to understand that, unlike their (the Slavs’) heathen ancestors, the Christians did not know of any black god. The name [Belbug] also well befits the clothes of the Premonstratensians, who [always] went dressed in white. The foundation of the monastery took place anno 1163.

Chernobog also appears in the anonymous Historia Caminensis as the god of the Vandals, which is based on a work by Münster (both works speak of the "error of the Manichaeans"). Chernobog and Belobog also appear in other minor texts.

== Interpretations ==
There is no consensus in the academic community about the status of Chernobog and Belobog in Slavic mythology, or whether the two gods existed at all in Slavic mythology. Some researchers completely reject the existence of Belobog due to his non-appearance in the sources. At least four views have developed in scholarship:

1. Chernobog is an epithet of Satan, and Belobog arose secondarily in later literature
2. Chernobog and Belobog are Slavic deities (actual theonyms or epithets of other deities)
3. Chernobog and Belobog are names of Christian figures with pre-Christian origin
4. Chernobog and Belobog are pseudo-deities, they did not exist in either the Christian or pagan vocabulary

=== As deities ===
Helmold's information led to the 19th century concept according to which there was supposed to be dualism in Slavic religion, which reached the Slavs from the Iranian peoples (Scythians, Sarmatians or Bogomils); Chernobog and the hypothetical Belobog were compared to Ahriman and Ormuzd, the eternal enemies in Zoroastrian mythology. In this spirit, Chernobog was interpreted by Alexander Hilferding. Later, Alexander Afanasyev and Alexander Famitsin considered the eastern counterpart of Belobog to be Belun (field spirit). None of these scholars, however, considered dualism an important element of Slavic religion; such a view was expressed only by Nikolay Kvashnin-Samarin in his amateur work Очерке славянской мифологии (1872), but his work is not considered important. Franciszek Slawski, in his Słownik prasłowiański, reconstructed the Proto-Slavic *bělъ bogъ "white, bright deity" and Proto-Slavic dial. *čŕ̥nъ bogъ "black deity, dark deity", for the latter the main attestation is supposed to be Helmold's account. Such dualism was advocated, for example, by Aleksander Gieysztor, Vyacheslav Ivanov and Vladimir Toporov considered Chernobog to be a god who brings misfortune. Some authors have tried to prove the cult of Chernobog with the names of the Czorneboh and Bieleboh mountains in Upper Lusatia, where the gods are said to have been worshipped, but these names were not created until the modern era due to the popularity of the gods in the culture of those areas. When considering the authenticity of the gods, place names that are said to refer to Chernobog and Belobog are also mentioned as arguments, such as the village of Chernobozhye in Russia or the village of Chernobozhna in Ukraine, also the neighboring villages of Černíkovice and Bělbožice in the Czech Republic are said to be evidence of the authenticity of the cult of Chernobog and Belobog; however, the former actually comes from a personal name, likely of the founder.

=== As pseudo-deities ===
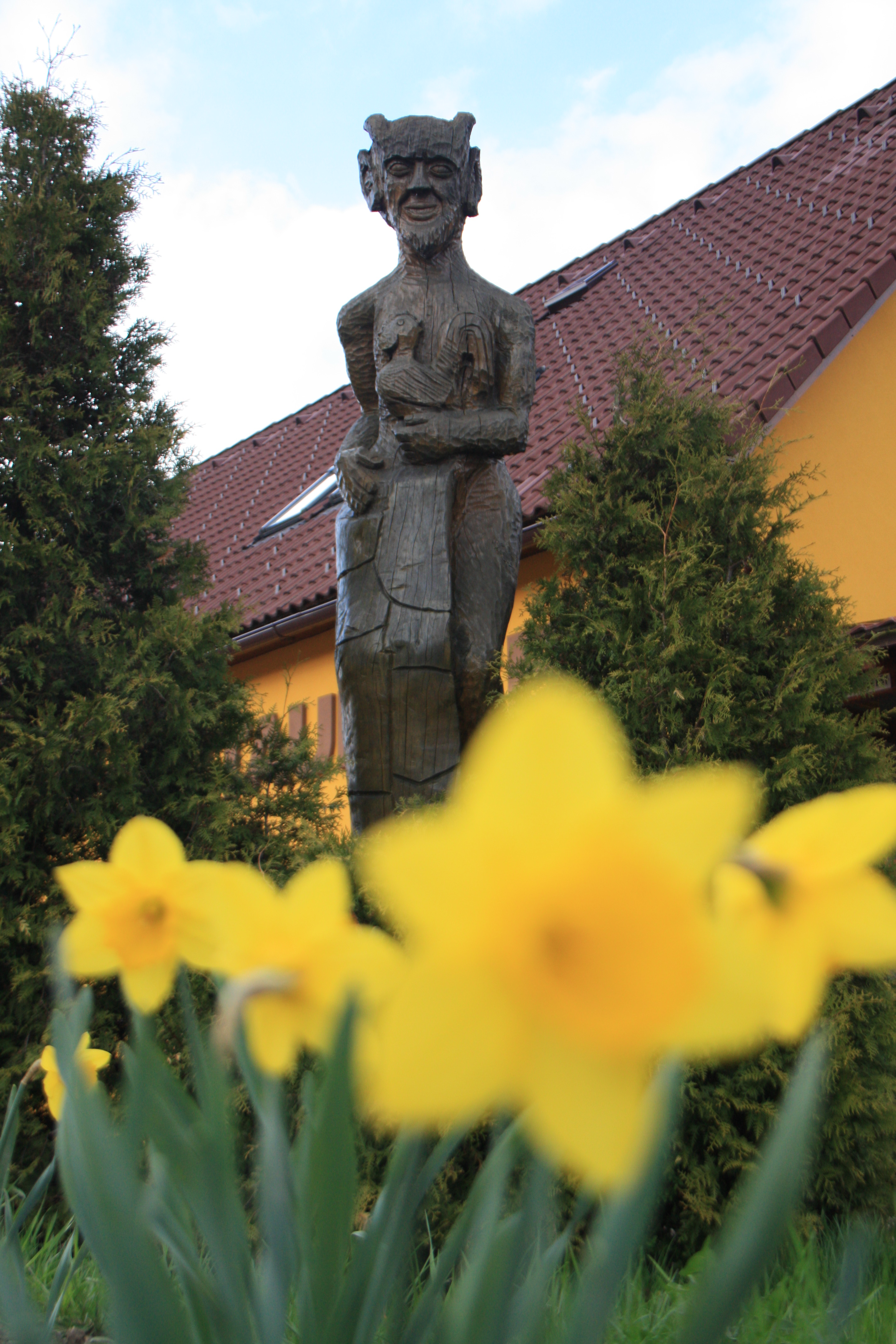
Czort sculpture by Jan Brlica, Jr. in Lidečko

On the other hand, many researchers considered Chernobog merely a personification of bad luck, some mistake by Helmold or a pseudo deity in general. Andrzej Szyjewski considered Chernobog only a pejorative epithet for the devil, Stanisław Urbańczyk said:

It is likely that Helmold heard something about the Slavs' belief in malevolent spirits, in personified fate, and combined it with Christian depictions, which, by the way, may have already permeated among the Slavs. This, in my opinion, is the kernel of his story; the connections with the Iranians must be abandoned in this case, because the basis is too fragile. The Slavic name for evil spirits were the words bies and czart; glaringly different from Chernobog.

His view was supported by Jerzy Strzelczyk. Chernobog was also supposed to be the personification of bad luck according to Martin Pitro and Petr Vokáč and Stanisław Rosik.

Aleksander Brückner negated the existence of Chernobog (and Belobog) in Slavic religion and claimed that Chernobog was created under the influence of Christianity, including medieval depictions of the devil as a black demon, and compared him to the Prussian god Pikulas, which ultimately derives from the Polish word piekło "hell". The view was supported by e.g. Henryk Łowmiański.

An extended analysis of Chernobog and Belobog was made by Michał Łuczynski. He points out, first of all, that Slavic linguistic material makes it easy to conclude that words like black god and white god have a pan-Slavic range and a Proto-Slavic origin. The attestations of the black god are as follows: Slovincian čǻrnï bȯ́u̯g "devil", Silesian Czorny Bóg "evil spirit, devil", and toponyms: Russian Chernobozhye, Ukrainian Chernobozhna and Serbian Černobožeskij gorodok; the attestations of the white god: Slovincian bjǻu̯lï bȯ́u̯g "God", Silesian Bioły Bóg "a good, human-friendly deity; a good spirit", Serbian dial. bel(i) bog "fate", Bulgarian dial. byal bog "luck, success", (Note: Also in phraseology: do byala boga "(shout) very strongly", nyamam byala boga "I have no peace", videt byala boga "to see consolation, joy".) and toponyms: Czech Bělbog, Bělbožice, Russian Belye bogi, Belovozhskiy monastyr, German Belboh, Belbog, Belbuk and others. According to him, the above material leads him to assume that: the words black and white used in the expressions were used in their metaphorical sense, successively "bad" and "good", and the word god was used in its abstract sense of "fate, luck, fate". Accordingly, Proto-Slavic *čŕ̥nъ bogъ meant "bad fate", and *bělъ bogъ "good fate" and this was their original meaning. Evidence of this etymology is provided by analogies, e.g. Polish czarna dola, Serbian crna sreća, crna sudbina, Croatian crna sudba all meaning "bad fate", lit. "black fate". Subsequently, these terms passed into personal names category and were used to describe God/Jesus and the devil as figures responsible for good fate and bad fate. Consequently, he considers Helmold's Chernobog to be a pseudo-deity, which has been misidentified by modern scholars as a deity due to Helmold's calque of black god and white god into Latin as niger deus and bonus deus which suggests that Slavic bog used in these terms = Latin deus, and personal names *Čŕ̥nobogъ "devil" and *Bělobogъ "God/Jesus" as semantic neologisms belonging to the Christian cultural circle, not pagan, as religious, not mythological terms, as may be further indicated by the toponymy (the Christian places of worship in Bielboh and Belovozhskiy monastyr).

== In popular culture ==
=== In Disney productions ===
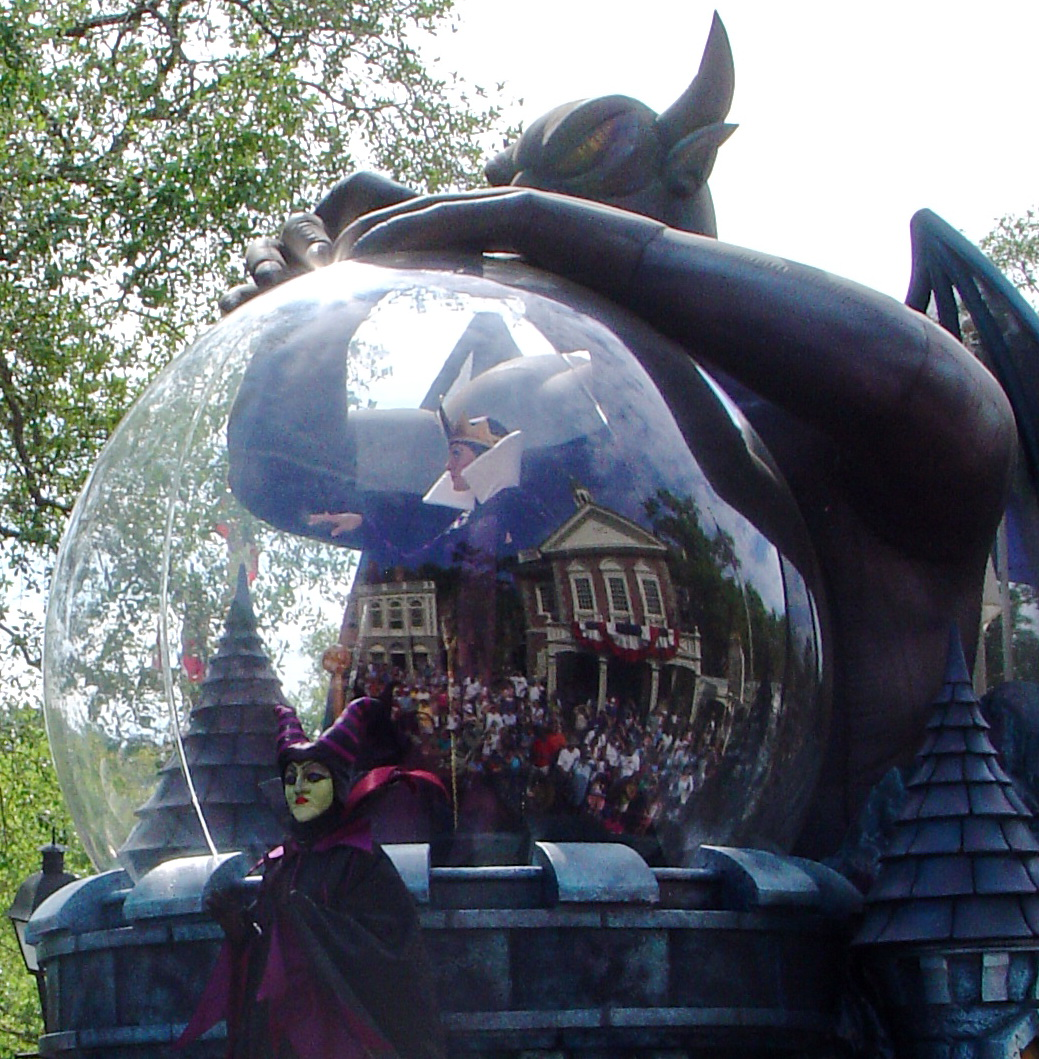
A float of Disney's rendition of Chernabog, holding the Wicked Queen from Disney's Snow White and the Seven Dwarfs.

An alternative version of Chernobog named Chernabog appears in the symphonic poem Night on Bald Mountain by Russian composer Modest Mussorgsky. He is depicted as a giant winged demon summoning the souls of the dead. One segment of Walt Disney's Fantasia (1940) was based on this work. The character may have been originally intended as a representation of Satan; in the film, Disney calls him "Satan himself". A full-length live-action film based on the segment was announced in 2015. Since Fantasia, Chernabog has appeared in many Disney productions:

- Fantasia 2000 (1999) – a sequel to the 1940 film; Chernabog appears in references to the first film
- House of Mouse (2001–2003) – guest starring in one episode along with other characters from Fantasia
- Mickey Mouse (2013) – in the episode "Touchdown and Out" as Mickey Mouse's opponent. In the episode "The Scariest Story Ever: A Mickey Mouse Halloween Spooktacular!", he is visible in the background during the introductory subtitles.
- Kingdom Hearts (2002) – as a boss during the End of the World
- Kingdom Hearts 3D: Dream Drop Distance (2012) - as a boss during the Fantasia inspired world Symphony of Sorcery

=== Movies and shows ===
- Once Upon a Time (2011–2018) – the Disney version appears in "Darkness on the Edge of Town" episode
- American Gods (2017–2021) – television series adaptation of the Neil Gaiman novel with the same name

=== Books and comics ===
- Walter Scott: Ivanhoe (1820) – Zernebock is depicted as the god of the ancient Saxons
- Heirs of Alexandria series (2002) – as an antagonist
- S. M. Stirling: The Peshawar Lancers (2002) – the action takes place in 2025, 147 years after the meteorite rain that destroyed the Earth. The Russians, believing that God and Jesus abandoned the world, began to worship Chernobog
- Chernobog appears as the god of chaos, darkness, and night in the Balto-Slavic pantheon of the Marvel Universe. He is a member of Winter Guard, a group of Russian superheroes
- Chernobog is the principal villain in Spinning Silver (2018), appearing as a demon of fire who possesses the Tsar
- Chernobog appears as the titular supernatural force in The God of Endings (2023) by Jacqueline Holland, as it slowly corners the female protagonist, who is a vampire

=== Video games ===
- Blood (1997) – Tchernobog is the primary antagonist, being depicted as a "bloodied, horned Dark God of monstrous appearance", who controls the cult known as "the Cabal."
- Bayonetta 2 (2014) - Chernobog is mentioned in the description of a scythe-like weapon of the same name as the demon that grants it power.
- Persona 3 (2006) - Chernobog is one of the many Personas the protagonist can embody for its powers in battle.
- Crusader Kings II (2012) – In expansions, Monks and Mystics, when a player plays as a pagan Slavic ruler, a Chernobog appears as a "Satanic" god, worshipped by a "Cold Bloods" sect
- Smite (2014) – as a playable character added in the May 2018 update. He is also the first god of the Slavic pantheon in this game
- Overwatch (2016) - Chernobog is the name of a "god program" AI tasked with overseeing world security. It is implied to be possessing the character Emre.
- Arknights (2019) – Chernobog is the name of the first town that the story takes place in.
- Honkai: Star Rail (2023) – Belobog is the name of the blizzard-stricken town in the first planet, Jarilo-VI, where the story takes place.
- Grand Theft Auto Online (2017) – An MLRS based on the Soviet MAZ-543M appears as the Chernobog.
- Zenless Zone Zero (2024) - Koleda Belobog is the name of one of the playable characters and is the president of the construction company Belobog Heavy Industries.

== See also ==
- Veles
- Nyja

== Bibliography ==
- Alvarez-Pedroza, Juan Antonio (2021). Sources of Slavic Pre-Christian Religion. Leiden: Koninklijke Brill. ISBN 978-90-04-44138-5.
- Brückner, Aleksander (1985). Mitologia słowiańska i polska (in Polish). Warsaw: Państwowe Wydawnictwo Naukowe. ISBN 8301062452.
- Culhane, John (1983). Walt Disney's Fantasia. Harry N. Abrams Inc. ISBN 978-3-8228-0393-6.
- Gieysztor, Aleksander (2006). Mitologia Słowian (in Polish). Warsaw: Wydawnictwa Uniwersytetu Warszawskiego. ISBN 978-83-235-0234-0.
- Gorbachov, Yaroslav (2017). "What Do We Know about *Čьrnobogъ and *Bělъ Bogъ". Russian History. 44 (2–3): 209–242. doi:10.1163/18763316-04402011.
- Ivanov, Vyacheslav; Toporov, Vladimir (1990a). "Белобог". In Meletinsky, Yeleazar (ed.). Мифологический словарь (in Russian). Moscow: Большая российская энциклопедия. p. 672.
- Ivanov, Vyacheslav; Toporov, Vladimir (1990b). "Чернобог". In Meletinsky, Yeleazar (ed.). Мифологический словарь (in Russian). Moscow: Большая российская энциклопедия. p. 672.
- Klejn, Leo (2004). Воскрешение Перуна: К реконструкции восточнославянского язычества (in Russian). Евразия. ISBN 5-8071-0153-7.
- Kulišić, Špiro; Petrović, Petar Ž.; Pantelić, Nikola (1970). Српски митолошки речник (in Serbian). Belgrade: Нолит.
- Łowmiański, Henryk (1979). Religia Słowian i jej upadek, w. VI-XII (in Polish). Warsaw: Państwowe Wydawnictwo Naukowe. ISBN 83-01-00033-3.
- Łuczyński, Michał (2020). Bogowie dawnych Słowian. Studium onomastyczne (in Polish). Kielce: Kieleckie Towarzystwo Naukowe. ISBN 978-83-60777-83-1.
- Pitro, Martin; Vokáč, Petr (2002). Bohové dávných Slovanů (in Czech). Prague: ISV. ISBN 80-85866-91-9.
- Rosik, Stanisław (2012). "Jarowit Mars i Czarny Bóg Diabeł. O rozmaitej genezie nowych tożsamości słowiańskich bóstw na północnym Połabiu (w kręgu przekazów z XII wieku)". Historia Narrat. Studia mediewistyczne ofiarowane profesorowi Jackowi Banaszkiewiczowi (in Polish). Andrzej Pleszczyński (red.). Lublin: Wydawnictwo Uniwersytetu Marii Curie-Skłodowskiej. pp. 263–276. ISBN 978-83-7784-189-1.
- Sławski, Franciszek (1974). "bělъ bogъ". Słownik prasłowiański (in Polish). Vol. 1. Wrocław, Warsaw, Kraków, Gdańsk: Zakład Narodowy im. Ossolińskich. p. 238.
- Sławski, Franciszek (1976). "čŕ̥nъ bogъ". Słownik prasłowiański (in Polish). Vol. 2. Wrocław, Warsaw, Kraków, Gdańsk: Zakład Narodowy im. Ossolińskich. p. 243.
- Strzelczyk, Jerzy (1998). Mity, podania i wierzenia dawnych Słowian (in Polish). ISBN 978-83-7301-973-7.
- Szyjewski, Andrzej (2003). Religia Słowian (in Polish). Kraków: Wydawnictwo WAM. ISBN 83-7318-205-5.
- Urbańczyk, Stanisław (1991). Dawni Słowianie. Wiara i kult (in Polish). Wrocław: Ossolineum.
