= Černíkovice =

Černíkovice may refer to places in the Czech Republic:

- Černíkovice (Plzeň-North District), a municipality and village in the Plzeň Region
- Černíkovice (Rychnov nad Kněžnou District), a municipality and village in the Hradec Králové Region
- Černíkovice, a village and part of Chrášťany (Benešov District) in the Central Bohemian Region
