= Jiłow =

Jiłow may refer to:

- Upper Sorbian name of Eilenburg
- Upper Sorbian name of Halbau, district of Cunewalde
