= Bieleboh =

Mountain in Upper Lusatia, Germany

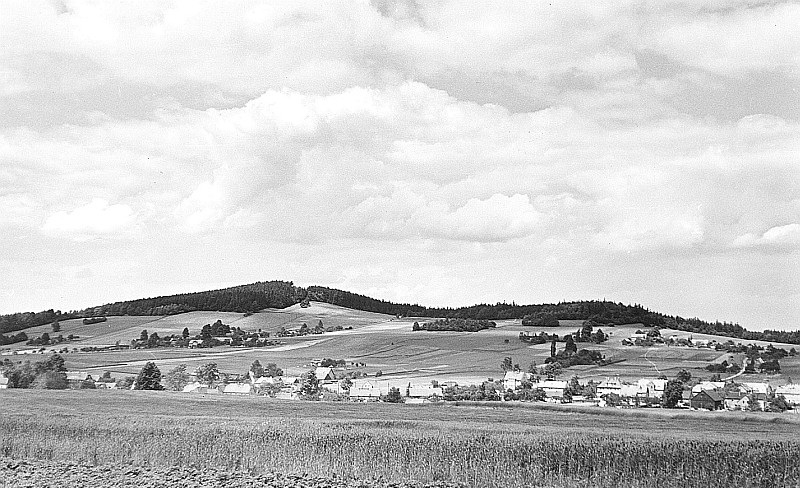
- Bieleboh seen from Hadermühle (1977)

Highest point
- Elevation: 499.5 m (1,639 ft); DE-HN
- Coordinates: 51°4′51″N 14°31′17″E

Geography
- Location within Saxony
- Location: Beiersdorf, Saxony, Germany
- Parent range: Lusatian Highlands

Bieleboh (Upper Sorbian: Běłobóh) is a mountain in the Lusatian Highlands, in the east of Saxony, Germany. Its summit is located on the grounds of Beiersdorf municipality.

== Geography and geology ==
Bieleboh is located between the villages of Beiersdorf and Cunewalde, on the border of districts Bautzen and Görlitz which passes about 60 m north of its summit. The mountain consists chiefly of granite and granodiorite. An observation tower and a mountain restaurant are located on its summit.

== Name ==
The name shows an analogy to that of the neighbouring mountain Czorneboh. As the latter refers to the deity Čorny Bóh (Upper Sorbian for "black god"), Bieleboh may be considered to be named after a "white god" Běły Boh. However, the latter is not explicitly mentioned in historic sources, but can possibly be identified with Svetovid. The authenticity of the Sorbian names is disputed, as they have only been recorded in the early modern period. In 1746, Bieleboh was still called Hoher Wald, and only on maps printed between 1780 and 1806 it was first named as Pilobogg or Beyersdorferberg, together with Zschernebog (Czorneboh). Another name, Kaspers Berg, which referred to the owner of the forest, a landowner and waggoner in Beiersdorf, has fallen out of use. In the course of the Germanisation of Slavic geographical names, the mountain was renamed Huhberg in 1936, but was named back in 1945.

== History ==
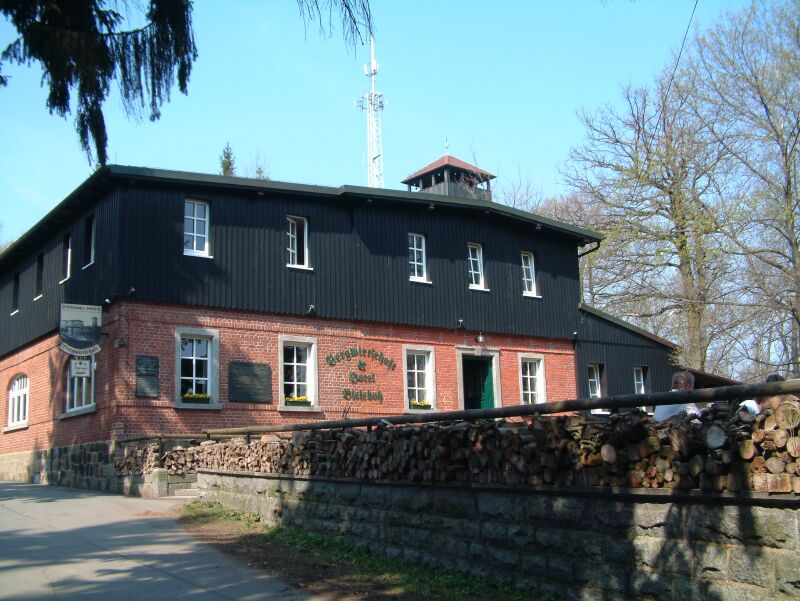
Mountain restaurant with observation tower (2004)

In 1841, Karl Benjamin Preusker (1786–1871), a librarian and archaeologist from Löbau, made drawings of a legendary rock formation on the summit which he called "the altar of Bielybog".

The inn keeper of Beiersdorf started to hold marksmens' fairs on the mountain after 1830.

The mountain club Oberes Spreetal ("Upper Spree valley") was founded in 1882 and began to build an observation platform near the existing obelisk, but abandoned this project in favour of a 12 m tall observation tower which was opened on 6 May 1883. This tower was destroyed by a lightning strike on 2 July 1910 and burned down completely. The Bieleboh club collected donations from the population, and Landesverein Sächsischer Heimatschutz (the national club for the preservation of the Saxon homeland) had a design drawn up for a new tower which was to be 4 m higher than the old one and received a roof. The new tower was already completed on 25 September 1910 and was ceremoniously opened. In 1994 it had fallen out of repair and had to be closed. It was renovated in 1998, and its height was increased by a further 5 m, reaching 21 m altogether in order to provide a better view across the tree tops.

== Solar observations ==
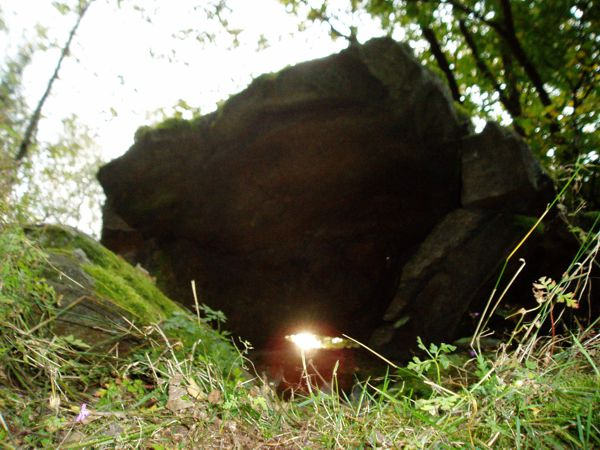
Sun shining through the opening in "Bieleboh altar" on an equinox

According to Karl Benjamin Preusker, several rocks in Upper Lusatia were considered prehistoric offering altars. Among these he counted a rock on Bieleboh, the so-called "Bieleboh altar". Local historians from Sohland an der Spree examined this presumed altar for its possible calendarial use for observations of the sun in 2007. It could be shown that an eye-shaped opening through the rock, the Teufelsauge ("devil's eye"), allows to determine the day of the equinox when the light of the rising sun passes through it.

== Tourism ==
The observation tower offers views across the Lusatian Highlands and the volcanic chain of the Lusatian Mountains. Notable mountains in view are Czorneboh, Kottmar, Löbauer Berg, and Oberoderwitzer Spitzberg. On clear days, the Jizera Mountains and Krkonoše in the south east as well as the Eastern Ore Mountains in the west can be seen.

A road leads from Beiersdorf to the summit. A parking lot for hikers is located 400 m ahead of the summit, on the saddle between Bieleboh and neighbouring Kuhberg. The long distance trail between Zittau and Wernigerode, marked with a blue stripe on a white background and known here as Oberlausitzer Bergweg (Upper Lusatian Mountain Trail), passes across the mountain. Several other hiking paths offer routes onto the mountain.
