= Halbau =

Halbau may refer to:

- German name of Iłowa, Poland
- Halbau, district of Cunewalde, Germany
