= Czorneboh =

Mountain in Germany

- Schleifberg, Praschwiza
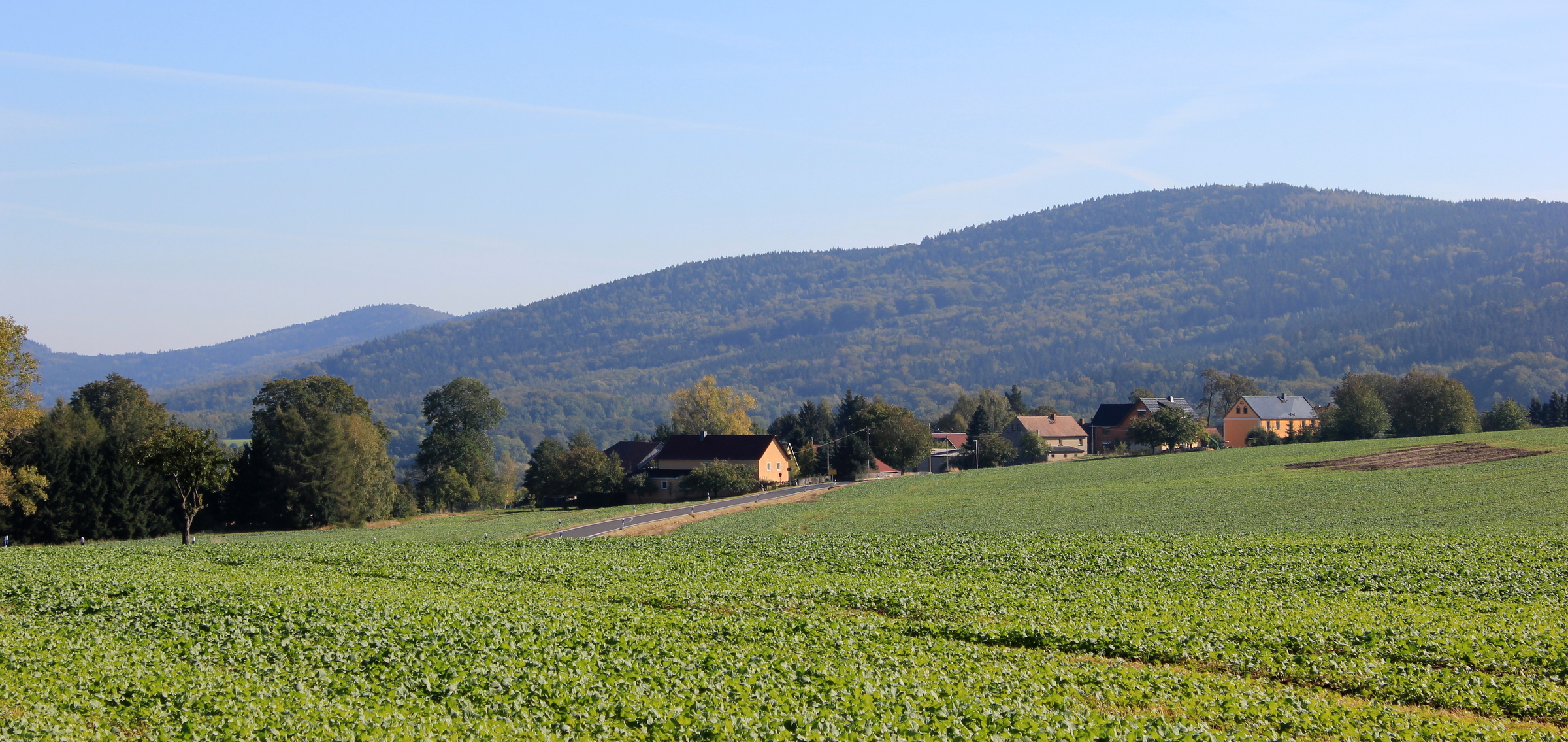
- North face of Czorneboh.

Highest point
- Elevation: 555.7 m (1,823 ft)
- Coordinates: 51°7′11″N 14°31′31″E

Naming
- Native name: Čornobóh (Upper Sorbian)
- English translation: Black god

Geography
- Location within Saxony
- Location: Saxony, Germany
- Parent range: Lusatian Highlands

Czorneboh (German pronunciation: [ˈtʃɔʁnəboː]; Upper Sorbian: Čornobóh, pronounced [ˈtʃɔʁnɔbʊx]) is a mountain between Hochkirch and Cunewalde in Upper Lusatia. Czorneboh is located 10 km from the German-Czech border north of Šluknov and 8 km southeast of Bautzen with an altitude of 555.7 m. It is the highest point of this foothill of the Lusatian Highlands. The peak of the Czorneboh is located in the district of Meschwitz (municipality Hochkirch). There is a mountain hostel and an observation tower on the top.

== Name ==
The name Czorneboh as the name of the highest mountain range between the municipalities of Cunewalde and Hochkirch, formerly known as Schleifberg or Praschwiza, is probably an 18th century invention. It starts with the mention of Helmold of Bozow in the Chronica Slavorum around 1168, in which he tells about the wealth of holy groves and gods among Slavs. In one fragment he writes: "Also, the Slavs have a strange delusion. At their feasts and carousals, they pass about a bowl over which they utter words, I should not say of consecration but of execration, in the name of two gods—of the good one, as well as of the bad one—professing that all propitious fortune is arranged by the good god, adverse, by the bad god. Hence, also, in their language, they call the bad god Diabol, or Zcerneboch, that is, the black god". The Pirnaic chronicler and Dominican Johannes Lindner in 1530 transferred the cult of the Chernobog to the Sorbs, but his chronicle is considered faulty and therefore unbelievable.

Around 1690, the deputy headmaster of the grammar school in Bautzen, master Martin Grünewald, wrote a brief historical description of Upper Lusatia, in which he mentioned the cult of the god Chernebog and the remains of altars on various mountains near Bautzen, but without mentioning the names of specific mountains.

Karl Gottlob von Anton describes a mountain named "after Chernebog" "near Wuißke" in Erste Linien eines Versuchs über der Alten Slaven Ursprung, Sitten, Gebräuche, Meinungen und Kenntnisse (Leipzig, 1783). Completely independently of this, however, Anton mentions Schleifberg and its Slavic name Praschwiza in another part of his work. Seven years later, in the Lausizisches Wochenblatt, the mountain Czernebog is mentioned for the first time, also here as an undefined mountain near Wuißke and with an obvious reference to Anton's writing. In 1791, in the 6th issue of the Lausizische Monatsschrif, today's Chernebog is clearly marked in this way. The contemporary Adolf Traugott von Gersdorff first described this mountain as "Mount of Meschwitz or Zschernebug" in his topographical drawings in 1789 and kept the name (later written Tschernebog).

In 1780-1806, the Saxon series of military maps was created. In it, the mountain was inscribed with the double name "Schleifenberg / Zschernebog". The rocks of the mountain peak were called "Hell" and "Devil's Stones". A protocol from 1804 in which the mountain is called "Zschorna-Bogk" comes from Meschwitz (in 1885, 94% of the Sorbian inhabitants), also as the direction of the road.

In the records of the town of Bautzen, which was the owner of the mountain, until the 19th century only the names Schleifberg, Exanberg or Finsterwald can be found.

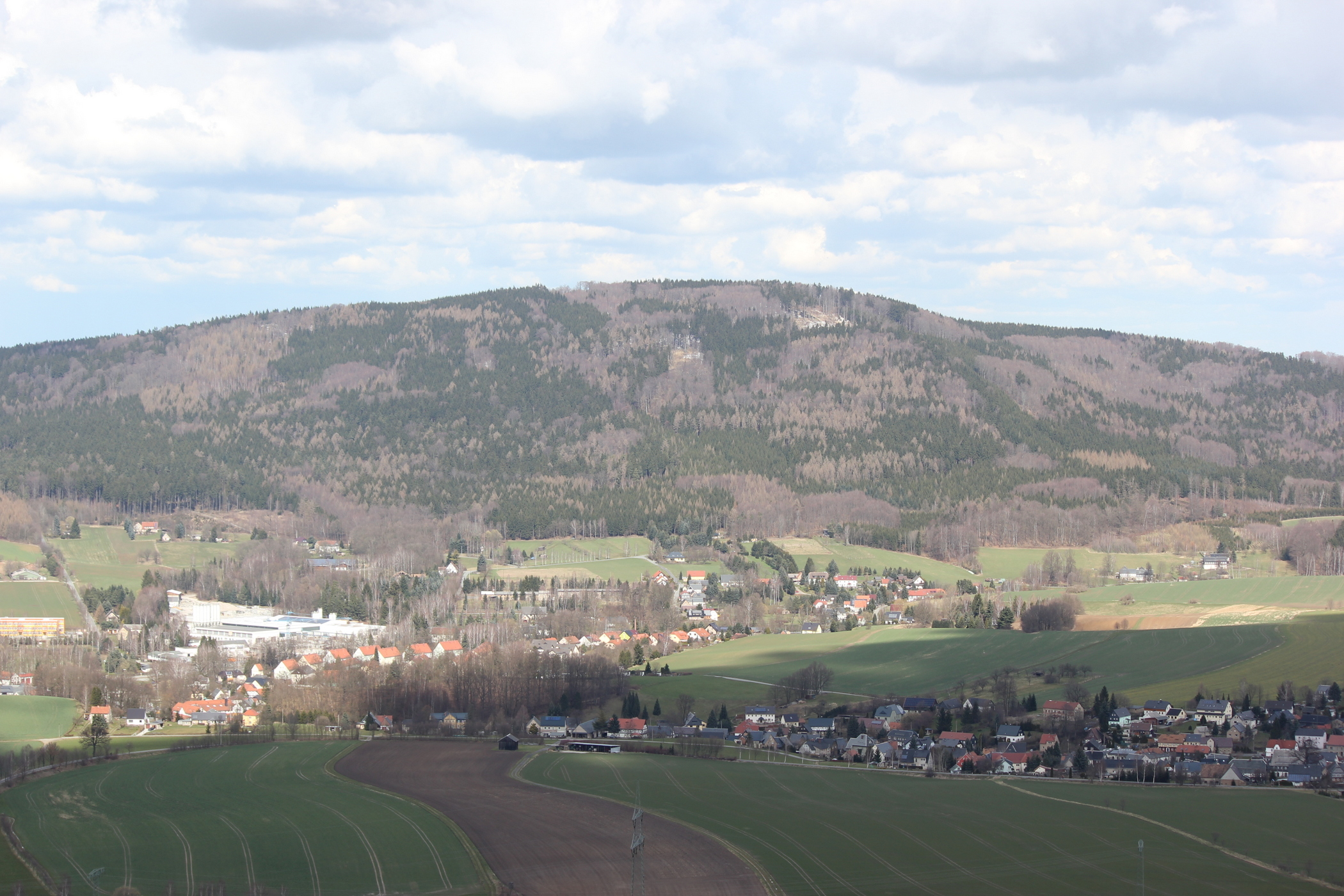
The south side of the mountain with Cunewalde in the foreground.

Carried by the spirit of romanticism, the name Czorneboh became the only name of the mountain until the mid-19th century. Devilish stories and legends about alleged Slavic place of worship on Czorneboh are well associated with the name. Karl Benjamin Preusker mentioned in his Ober-Lausitzische Altertümer from 1828 various legends and many folk tales that took place around the rocks of Czorneboh. For example, the oracle of the gods, places of devils, pilgrimages and victims of "pagan reactions," as well as speculation on the destruction and burial of "ancient objects". In his later, more extensive work from 1841, he even showed a detailed map with various legendary places such as the "devil's pulpit", "devil's window", "hell", and a "cauldron" (sacrificial cauldron). The first detailed legends appeared in 1839 in Heinrich Gottlob Gräve's Volkssagen und volksthümliche Denkmale der Lausitz, and by the middle of the century, there is more than half a dozen of them.

In 1927, the Bautzen priest, historian and chronicler Erwin Wienecke criticized the discussion about the name of the mountain: "The public opinion was more interested in the bootless "will to prove" than in a logical, definitive solution". He initiated the change of the German name Czorneboh to Schleifberg, which was documented in 1571 and was in his opinion the only correct name. His strong emphasis met with the support of the movements of National Socialist decision-makers and became binding during the Germanization of town names. In 1937, due to a conflict over the name change, Wl. Schütze, Friedrich Sieber and Pawel Nedo interviewed the elderly Sorbs in the Czorneboh area in secret. It turned out that some of the interviewees said "Na Čornyboh" and meant "on the Black god" but sometimes they also said "Na Čornyboku" and meant "on the black side" of the mountain in the sense of the shaded or northern side. It is possible that the similarity of the words led to confusion. The term Schleifberg was until now completely unknown to all interrogated Sorbs. The name change to Schleifberg was withdrawn after 1945.

Apart from Anton, the Slavic name "Prašwica" was mentioned in 1712 by the Sorbian priest, historian and linguist Abraham Frencel, who named the northern part of the mountain in this way. He took it out of the Upper Sorbian word prašca ("to ask"; German: "fragen") and translated it as "Frageort" or "Frageberg. For a long time, this interpretation was regarded as evidence of a former place of worship with an oracle on top of the mountain, typical of the Slavic religion. In 1910, the Sorbian folklore scholar Jan Awgust Jenč denied Frenzel's interpretation, assuming that it originated from the lesser-used Upper Sorbian prašiwy ("mangy"). Today, this interpretation dominates and it is believed that it may have meant a difficult climb up a mountain or stones that were not suitable for processing.

== Observation tower and restaurant ==
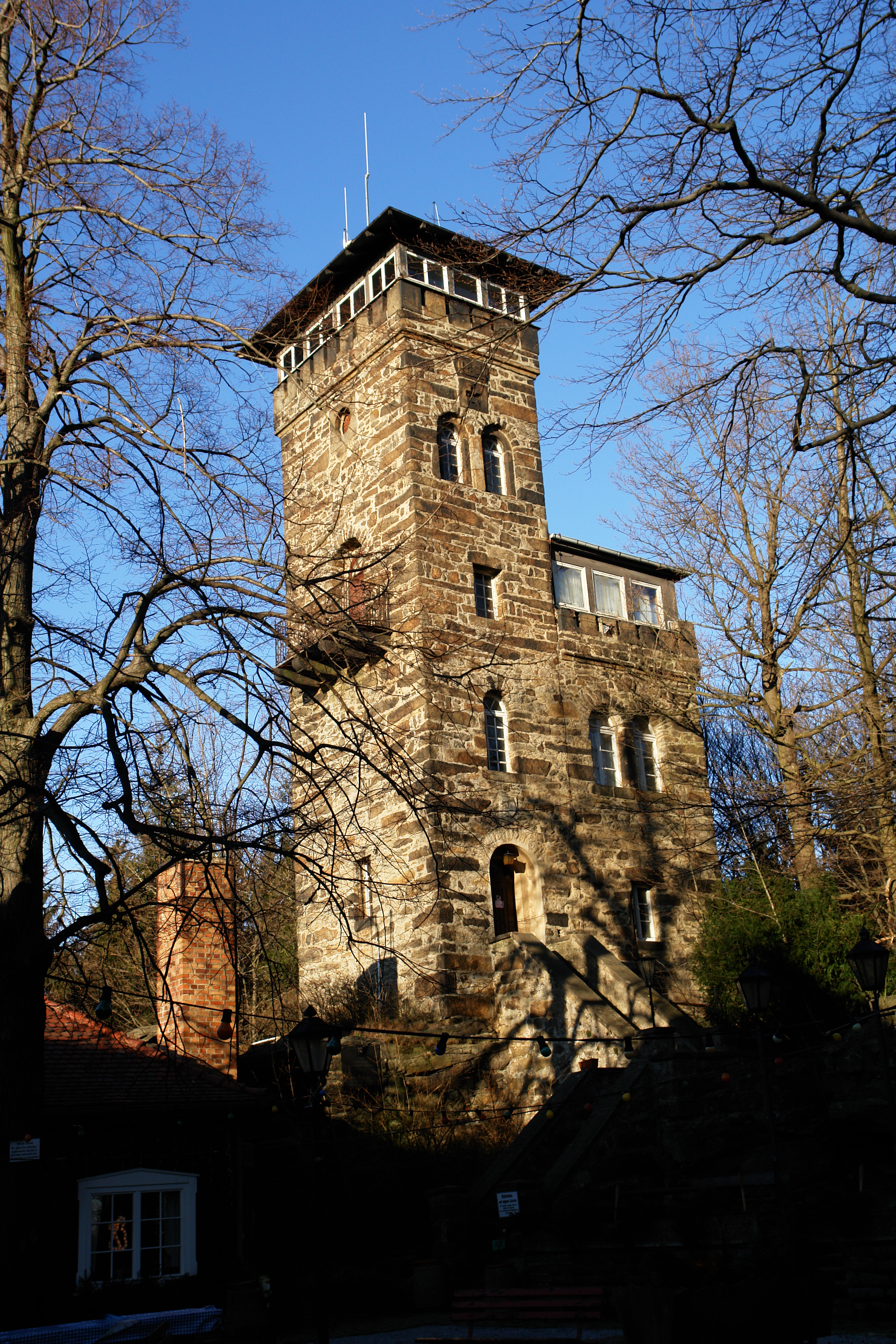
The observation tower on Chornoboh.

On the mountain there is a 23 m high observation tower from the 19th century and a restaurant with a beer garden. The construction was applied for in 1850 by the forester Walde from Wuischke to the city council of Bautzen. First, the tower was built by Karl Traugott Eichler from Lauba according to the design of the architect Traugott Hobjan from Bautzen. This was completed on May 17, 1851 and opened in 1852 together with the inn. In 1856 a well was completed. The stone tower is the oldest of its kind in Upper Lusatia. In 1928 the tower was given a wooden structure, which burned down on December 19, 1944. Due to its proximity to Bautzen and the good infrastructure on the mountain, the summit of the Czorneboh is a popular destination.

The restaurant was temporarily closed on October 1, 2013, and then completely renovated by the city of Bautzen. This included the roof, walls, floors, heating, ventilation and sanitation. Furthermore, the kitchen has been completely renovated. From April 16, 2016, restaurant is again open to tourists and pedestrians.

== Place of religious worship ==
Even before Czorneboh received this mythological name, the group of stones on its top was associated with the idea of a Slavic place of worship on the mountain. Conrad Bote indirectly mentions in his Cronecken der Sassen (1492) that the stones played a role in the cult of the Slavs in Lusatia, reporting on the year 1116 and the destruction of the idol of Flins, who stood on the "Flins Rock". Archeology has found no evidence of any function of the naturally formed group of stones on Chorneboh.

On the eastern hill of the Czorneboh chain on Hochstein there is a rock group with a prehistoric rampart. In 1841 Karl Benjamin Preusker suspected a pagan sacrificial site there. Archaeological research around 1900 revealed Slavic or medieval applications. The function of the place could not be clarified. Around 1350 the rocks were supposed to serve as a hiding place for a gang of robbers, therefore on old maps the place was also called a robbery castle.

In Lusatia, there are remains of about 30 Slavic ramparts, 10 of which can be reached in an hour's walk from the foot of Czorneboh (Blösa, Zschorna, Kirschau, Niethen, Lauske, Doberschau, Schöps (2×), Nechen, Belgern).

From the discovery of a stone axe and Slavic debris in Halbendorf, the bronze Age finds in Köblitz and the numerous Sorbian field names in the Cunewald valley, it can be concluded that the south of Czorneboh was also inhabited in prehistoric times. The high density of prehistoric evidence on and around the mountain range makes the religious significance of the mountain seem at least possible.

On the Schmoritz, in the western foothills of the Czorneboh range, the remains of the perimeter wall have also been preserved. It probably served as a smelting site in Slavic times. The Chorneboh mountain range also forms the southern border of the settlement area of the Lusatian culture in the Bronze Age.

== Legends ==
Although Czorneboh as a historical place of worship has not yet been proven archaeologically, it was already in the early modern era a projection site for various mythological ideas. Its main element was a group of rocks on top of a mountain. It was believed that the altars were stacked with sacrificial bowls, torch holders and "Question Holes". In nearby Hromadnik, an old Slavic meeting place was seen because of its name (lit. "place of assembly", from hromada). Combined with the revival of regional historical interests and the opinion of medieval and early-modern historians, it became clear that the cult of the Chernebog, or at least some deity of night and death, was also found in Finsterwald ("dark, black forest"). Added to this are the classical Christian toposes, such as the "Devil's Foot", "the Hoof-shaped Stone", or the "Devil's Window" (the "Question Holes" mentioned at the same time) with the accompanying legend of the "Devil's Window on the Black Forest". Similarly to the Chernebog-Czorneboh stands the Belebog-Bieleboh. Helmold indirectly mentioned this god as the "god of good luck". This "White God" also received a mountain in Upper Lusatia. It is located opposite Czorneboh, on the edge of the well-known area of the Milceni settlement. In Saxon sheets from 1780-1806 it was registered at the same time as the "Zschernebog" as "Pilobogg or Beyersdorferberg". In 1841, Karl Benjamin Preusker drew a stone formation of a mountain peak, which the legend says, which he called the "Altar of Belebog". To what extent the sanctity of the site is mere speculation or actual tradition is disputed.

Examples of legends related to Chornebog: "The goblin chamber on the Czornebog", "The devil's window at Czorneboh", "The violet of Czorneboh", "The devil's pool on the Czorneboh", "The Gold Cellar on the Frageberg", "Chernobog and Belebog".

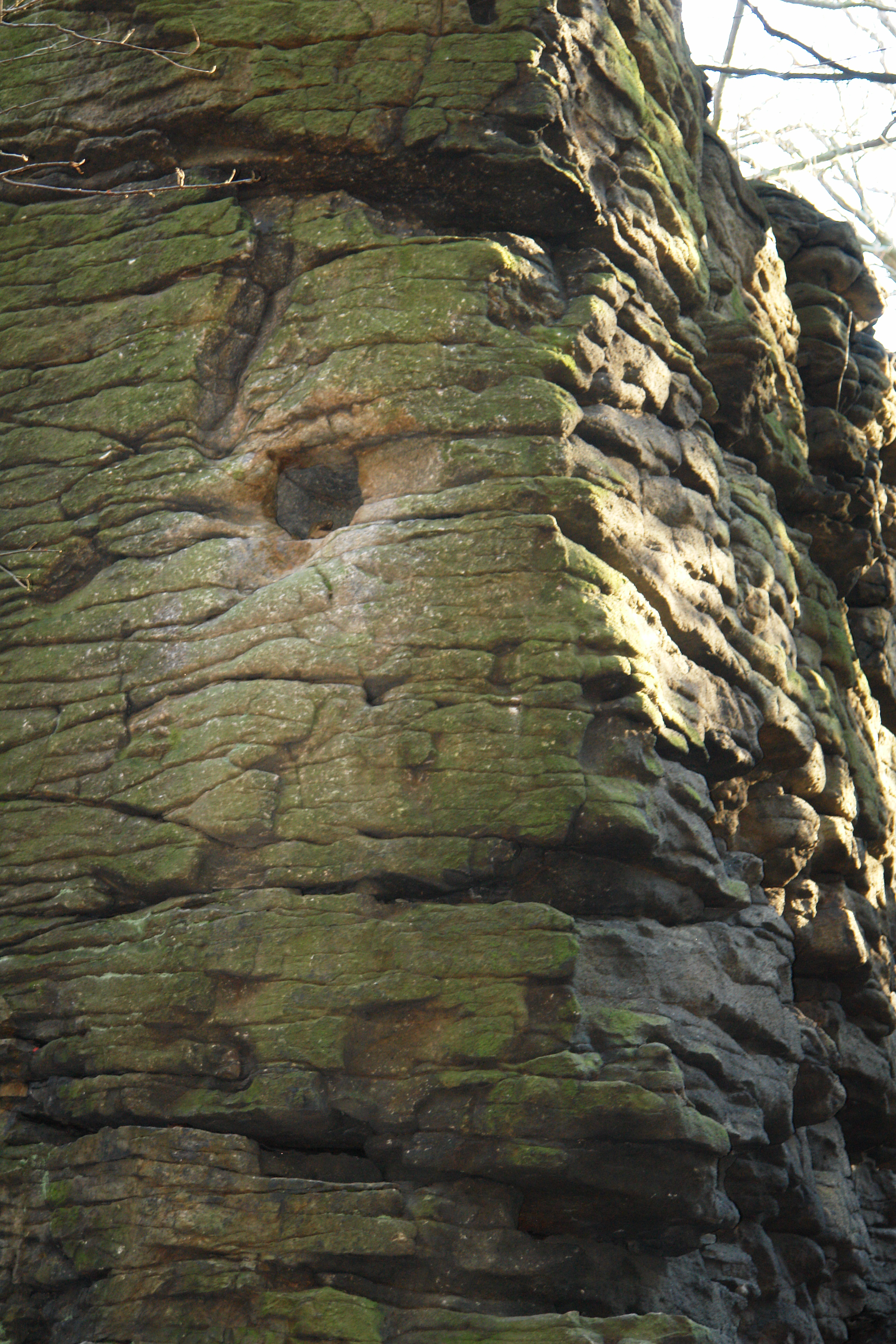
"Devil's window" or "Question Hole".

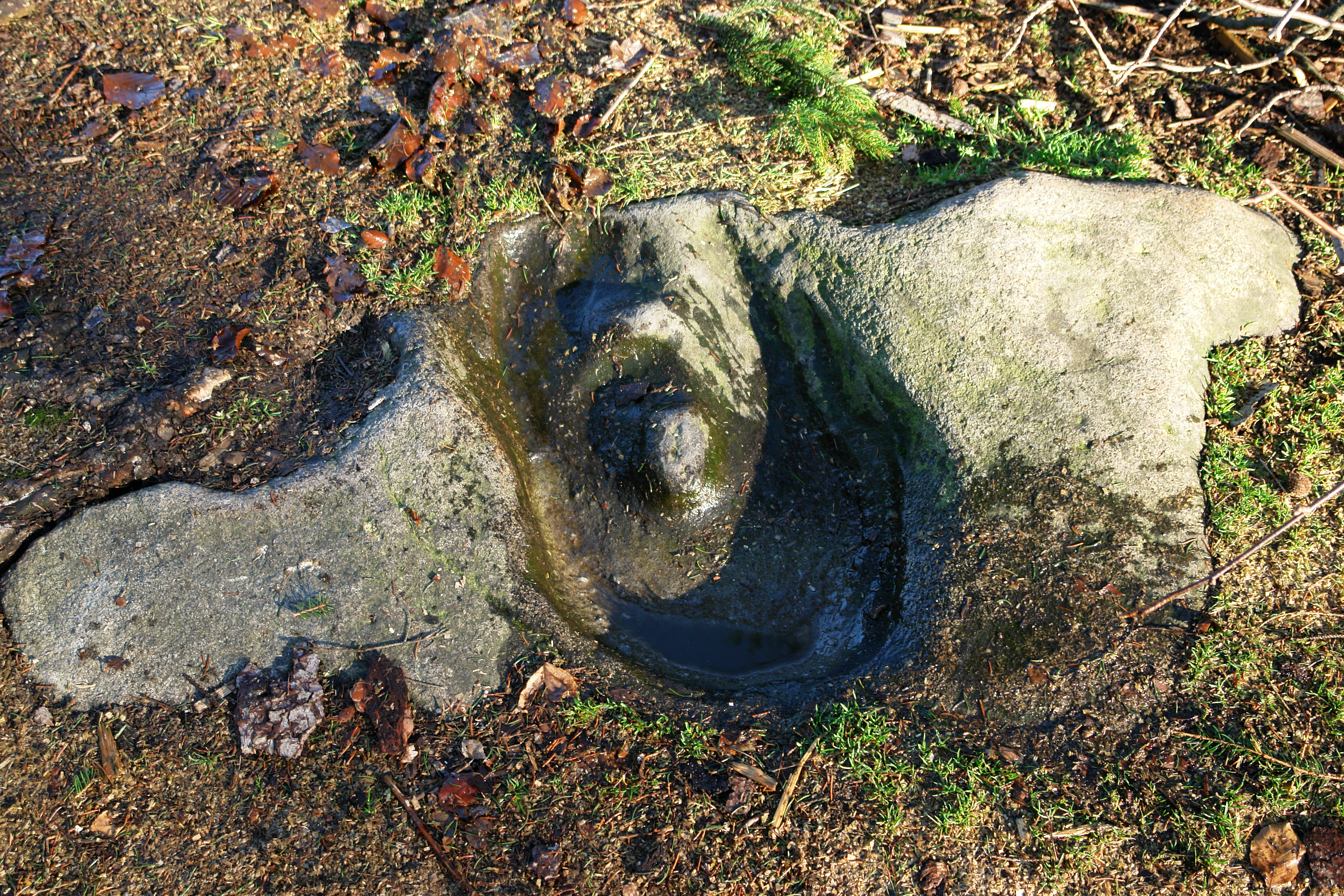
"Devil's Foot".

"Sacrificial pool".

== Solar phenomenon ==
Since 2008, the public and school observatory Bruno-H.-Bürgel in Sohland/Spree, Department of Archaeoastronomy, has been examining various rocks in Upper Lusatia for their suitability for calendar solar observations. At the top of Czorneboh, it was found that the rock formations "Ente" and "Teufelstisch" (today "Teufelskanzel von Rachlau") are suitable for calendar solar observations, and human influence on the setting of calendar viewing holes was considered possible. The archaeo-astronomical research project was called "Project - Hand of the Gods", and rock objects that show the calendar phenomenon of solar observation were treated as "solar sanctuaries of Upper Lusatia".

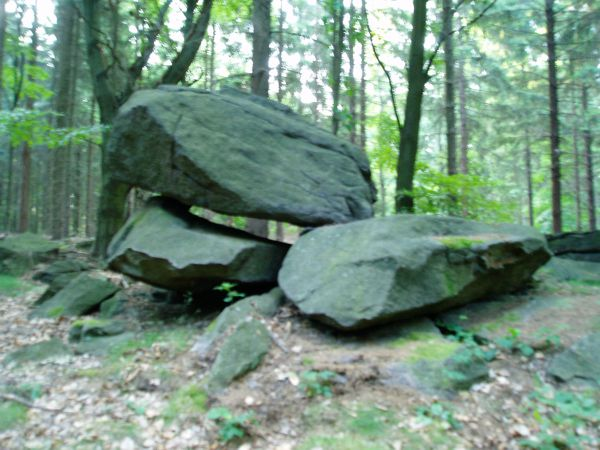
"Ente", the observation station for sunrise and sunset at the solstice.

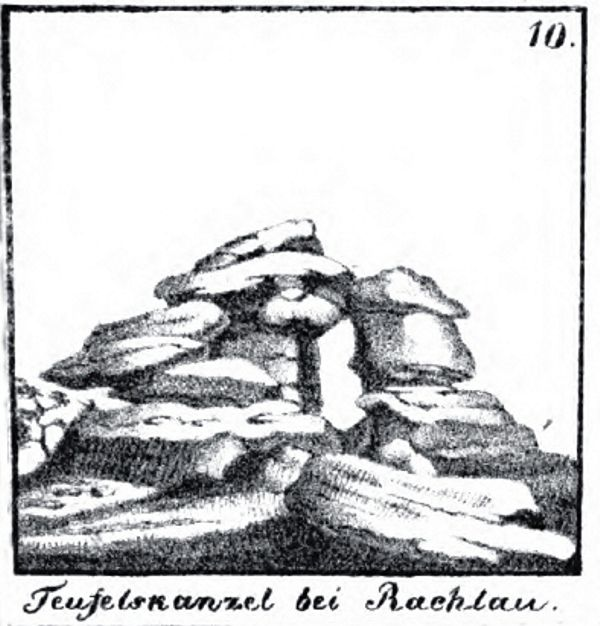
"Teufelskanzel von Rachlau", drawing by Karl Preusker, 1841.

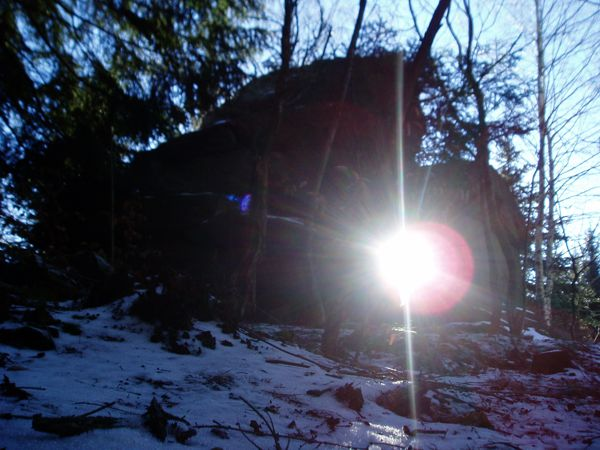
"Teufelskanzel von Rachlau", Winter solstice at sunset around noon, 2007.

== Literature ==
- Erwin Wienecke: Czorneboh und Bieleboh. Eine quellenkritische Studie aus dem Gebiet der slawischen Religionsgeschichte. in: Bautzener Geschichtshefte 4.6 (1927), p. 205–240.
- Zwischen Strohmberg, Czorneboh und Kottmar. Werte der deutschen Heimat. Vol. 24. Berlin: Akademie Verlag. 1974.
- Gurlitt, Kornelius (1908). Amtshauptmannschaft Bautzen (I. Teil) Beschreibende Darstellung der älteren Bau- und Kunstdenkmäler des Königreichs Sachsen. Werte der deutschen Heimat. Drezno: Meinhold. p. 52.
- Karl Preusker: Blicke in die vaterländische Vorzeit, Leipzig 1841
- Ralf Herold: Die Fährte des Lichts – Projekt Götterhand – Sonnenheiligtümer der Oberlausitz. Sternwarte Sohland/Spree, Books on Demand, Norderstedt 2020, ISBN 978-3-7519-5892-9
