= Hochstein (Lawalde) =

Mountain in Lawalde, Germany

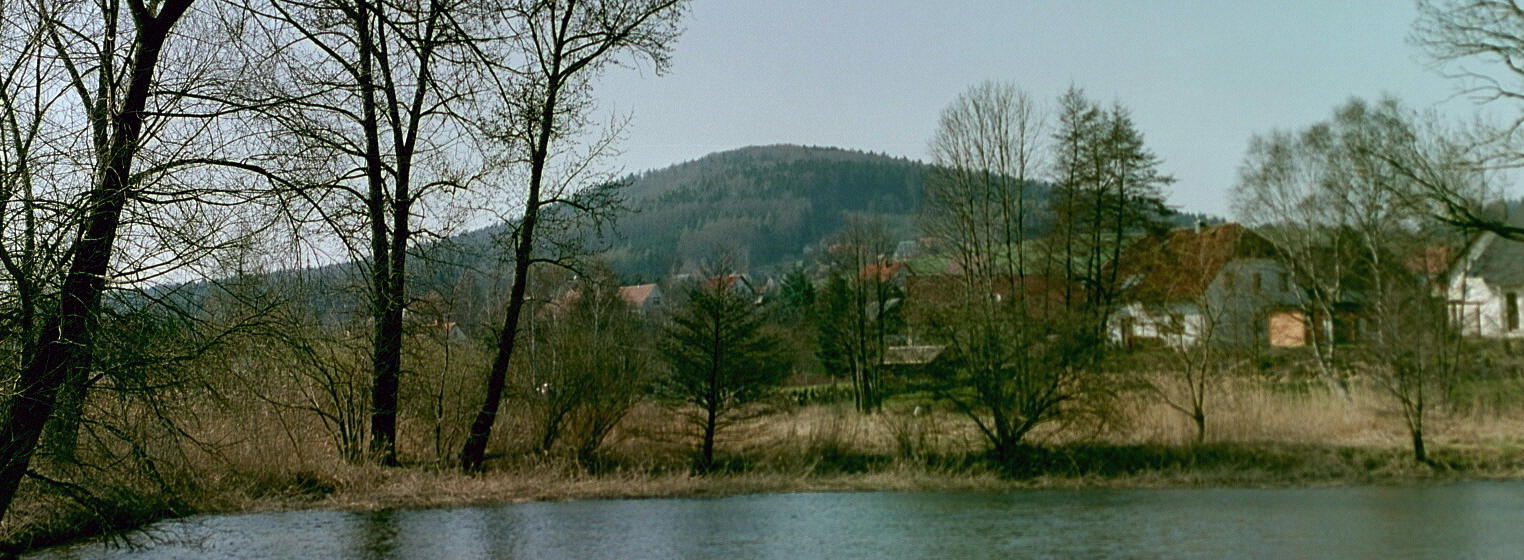
- Hochstein seen from Kleindehsa

Highest point
- Elevation: 533.1 metres (1,749 ft)
- Coordinates: 51°6′58″N 14°34′18″E

Geography
- Location within Saxony
- Location: Saxony, Germany
- Parent range: Lusatian Highlands

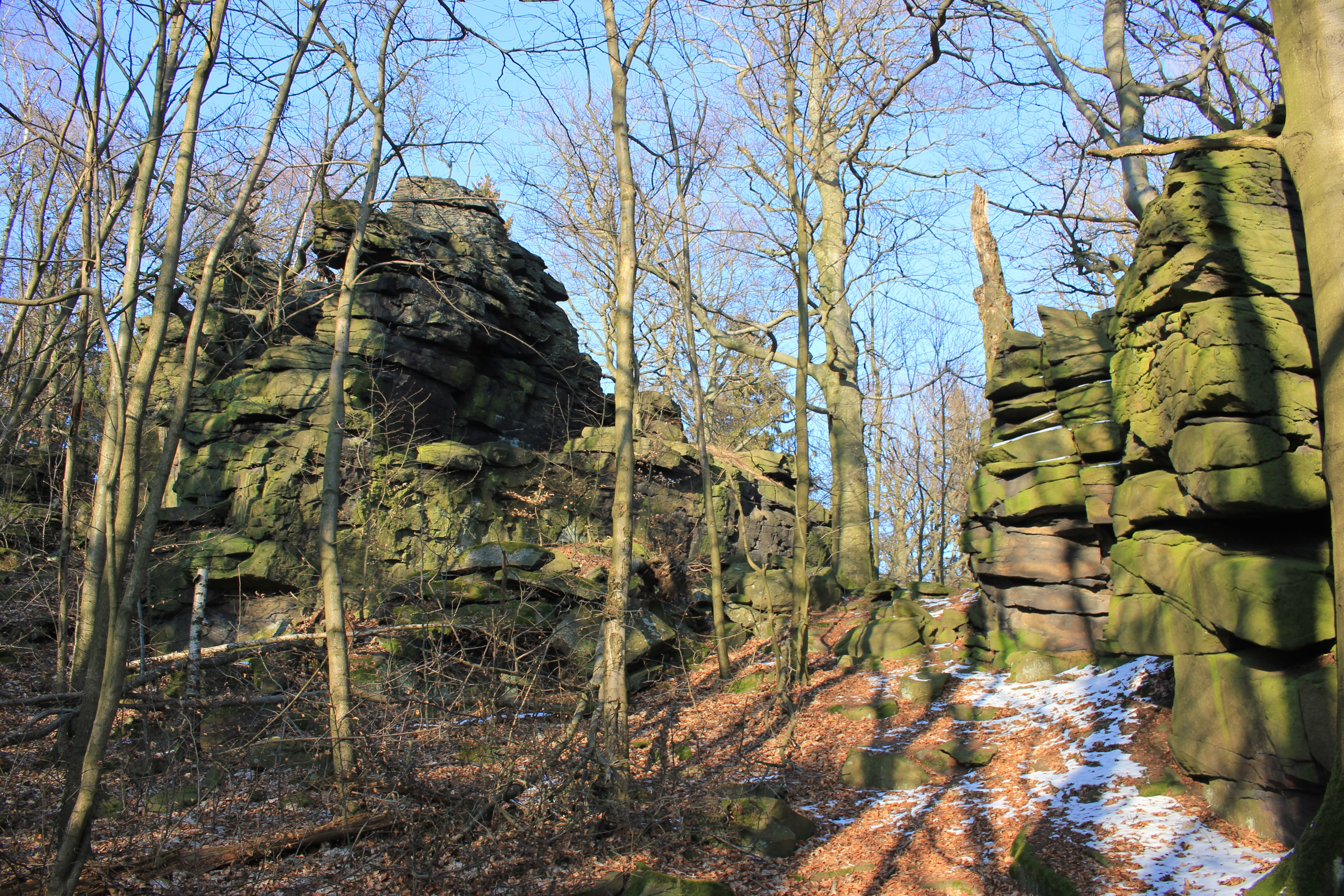
Rock formations near the summit

The Hochstein (Sorbian: 'Rubježny hród') is a mountain in Saxony, eastern Germany. At an elevation of 533.1 m (1,749 ft), it is the easternmost peak of the Czorneboh chain in the Upper Lusatian Highlands.

At the summit cliffs, which are under protection as natural monuments, the mica granodiorite of which the mountain consists can be observed breaking through the surface.

== Ramparts ==
A prehistoric rampart encloses the up to 10 m high rocks. In 1841, historian Karl Benjamin Preusker suspected a pagan sacrificial place at the site. Archaeological investigations around 1900 revealed a Slavic or other medieval use. The question after the function of the site, however, could not be answered. Around 1350 the rocks are said to have served as a hiding place to a group of bandits, which is why the site was also called a robber castle on old maps and is still called so in Sorbian today.

== Hiking trails ==
The Kammweg, which leads from Kleindehsa to Großpostwitz, is marked with the hiking mark "Blauer Punkt". It is a part of the long-distance hiking trail "Wanderweg der Deutschen Einheit" (Hiking Trail of the German Reunification) from Görlitz in the east to Aachen in the west.

The Kriegsweg (war path) runs south of the summit and received its name in the Seven Years' War after Austrian troops crossed the ridge in the night of 14 October 1758 to attack the Prussians in the Battle of Hochkirch.

A hiking trail on the southern slope of the Hochstein from Halbau bears the name Polenzweg in memory of the poet Wilhelm von Polenz, whose favourite mountain is said to have been the Hochstein.
