= Hromadnik =

Mountain in Germany

Coordinates: 51°07′19″N 14°30′13″E

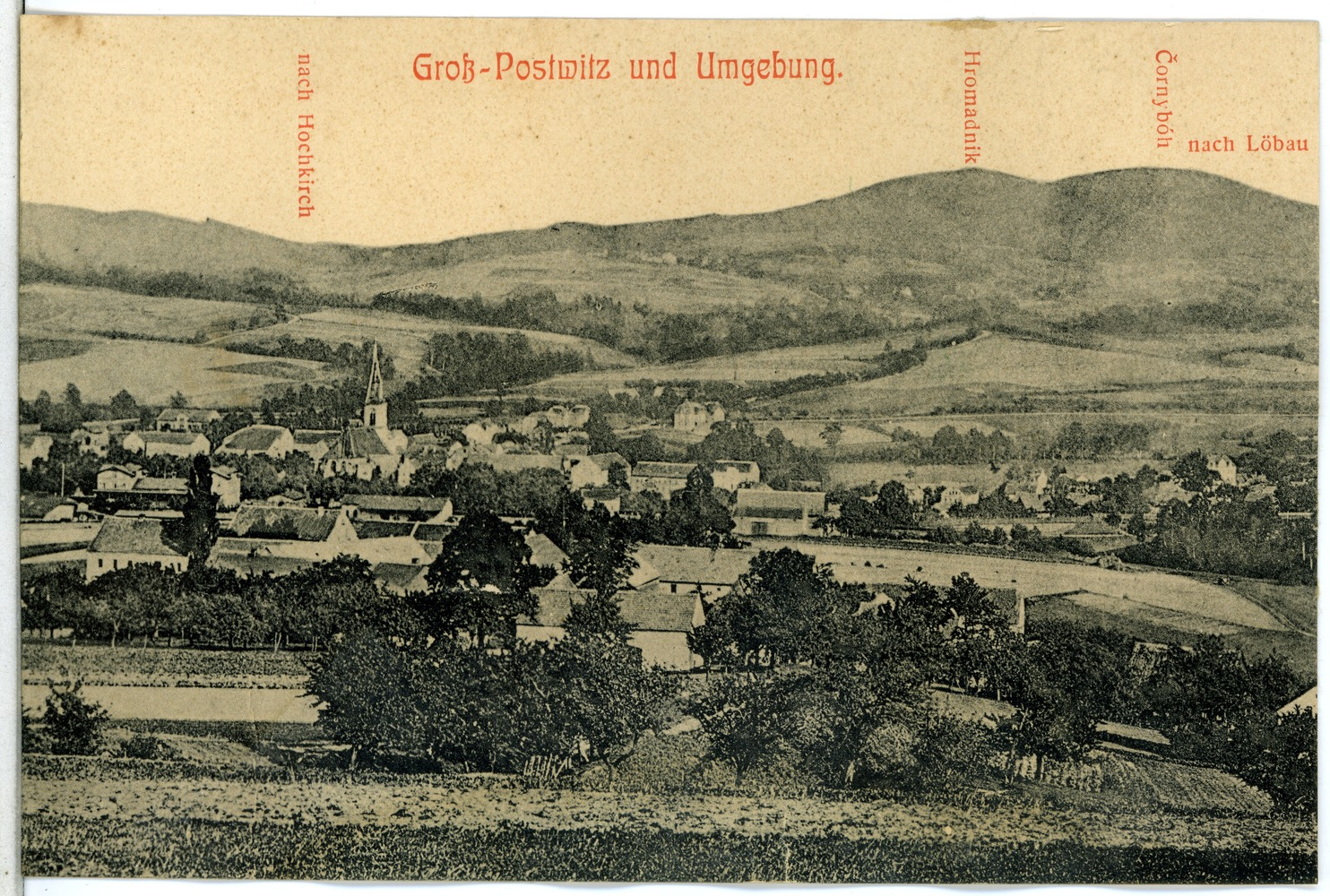
- Hromadnik

Highest point
- Elevation: 514 m (1,686 ft)

Geography
- Location: Saxony, Germany

Hromadnik is a mountain of Saxony, southeastern Germany.
