= Flins (mythology) =

God of death in Wendish mythology

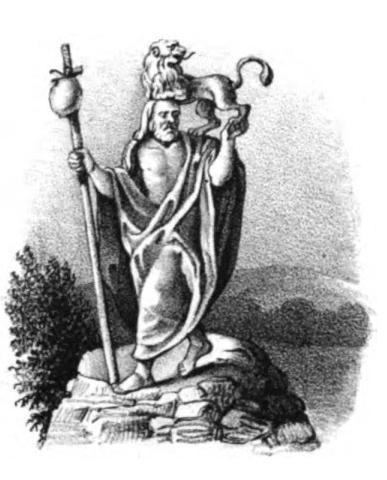
An 18th-century depiction of Flins

Flins (also recorded as Flinz or Flyns) is a well-documented pagan pseudo-deity, alleged to have been a god of death, rebirth, or good fortune among the West Slavic Sorbs (Wends) of Upper and Lower Lusatia. First introduced in a German chronicle in 1492, modern historical and onomastic scholarship has firmly established that Flins never existed in genuine Slavic paganism. Instead, the figure is recognized as a classic Renaissance fabrication, created by early modern chroniclers to fill gaps in medieval records, glorify Christian missionary efforts, or retroactively explain existing local geographic place-names.

== Origin of the Myth (1492) ==
The entire myth of Flins originates from a single source: the Cronecken der Sassen (Chronicle of the Saxons), published in 1492 and attributed to the Braunschweig goldsmith and chronicler Konrad Bothe. Bothe lacked reliable contemporary sources for pre-Christian Slavic beliefs and routinely invented spectacular pagan idols to make his historical narratives more vivid. Among his prominent fabrications was also Krodo, a fictitious Germanic/Saxon deity.

Bothe described Flins as an idol of death made of stone, depicting a dead man or a skeleton draped in a long cloak. According to his chronicle, the idol carried a burning torch in its hand and featured a roaring lion resting upon its left shoulder, which was said to symbolize the resurrection of the dead. Fabricating such elaborate stone idols was a common practice among late-medieval and Renaissance chroniclers in Central Europe to retroactively justify the violent medieval crusades, framing them as heroic victories over demonic forces. Bothe asserted that the Sorbs worshipped this figure at a prominent mountain peak known as the Flinsberg.

== Historiographical Expansion by Christophorus Manlius ==
In the 16th century, the myth was significantly expanded and romanticized by the humanist and historian Christophorus Manlius (1546–1575) from Görlitz. In his 1570 treatise De idolo Lusatiorum deiecto Flyns ("On the Overthrown Lusatian Idol Flins"), Manlius spun an elaborate adventure story around Bothe’s fictional deity to bridge historical gaps and trace its supposed physical journey:

1. The Overthrow (1106): Manlius claimed that during a Christian military campaign in 1106, the statue of Flins was pulled down by Christian forces near Bautzen and thrown into the River Spree.
2. The Secret Rescue: According to Manlius, pagan Slavic believers secretly rescued the idol from the river and hid it on the Hochstein, a peak in the Königshain Hills.
3. The Final Hiding Place: As Christianization advanced, the pagans supposedly moved the statue deep into the dense forests of the Jizera Mountains, placing it inside a cave near local mineral springs.

Through this narrative, Manlius created an etiological myth—a fictional backstory designed specifically to explain why a newly developing forest community in the Jizera Mountains had been named Flinsberg (modern-day Świeradów-Zdrój, Poland). Modern linguistic science has since proven that the name has no pagan connection; it derives directly from the Middle High German word vlins, meaning flint, quartz, or hard rock, which was used by medieval German miners and lumbermen to describe the actual geology of the rocky mountain terrain.

== 20th-Century Political Instrumentalization ==
Following World War II, when Lower Silesia became part of the People's Republic of Poland, the myth of Flins was ideologically adapted by communist-era authorities and regional researchers. Under the state-sponsored narrative of the Recovered Territories (Ziemie Odzyskane), Polish historiography and cultural institutions sought to cultivate a sense of historical belonging for the newly arriving Polish settlers, legitimizing their presence in a region that had been entirely German-populated for centuries by emphasizing its ancient Slavic roots.

This political backdrop led to a twofold manipulation of the Flins narrative:

- Linguistic Re-Slavization: State-sponsored linguists like Stanisław Rospond systematically rejected the Germanic origin of the place-name Flinsberg. Instead, they constructed a pseudo-etymological theory claiming that Flins was a phonetic German distortion of an ancient Slavic hydronym or geographic term, such as *Wełna (meaning a wet or marshy area), attempting to scientifically prove a Slavic presence predating medieval German colonization.
- Popular Folklore and Continuous Presence: Popular travel writers and regional geographers popularized Manlius’s story in tourist guidebooks. They framed the legend of the hidden Slavic idol as an underlying historical truth. This effectively suggested to new Polish settlers that by living in the Jizera Mountains, they were overcoming their sense of displacement and restoring a native Slavic continuity that had merely been suppressed by centuries of German rule.

== Reception and Legacy ==
Despite being a scientific fiction, the myth of Flins achieved immense popularity. From the 16th to the 19th centuries, numerous writers, poets, and local historians—including Christian Knauthe and Friedrich Lucae—uncritically copied Manlius’s and Bothe’s accounts, cementing Flins into regional folklore. No archaeological excavations in Upper Lusatia or the Jizera Mountains have ever uncovered any physical evidence, shrines, or altars related to such a figure.

In the post-communist era, the ideological battle faded, and the town of Świeradów-Zdrój embraced Flins as a purely commercial tourism brand. Today, Flins is featured in hotel names, local craft beers, and city marketing as a legendary folklore character, while academically studied strictly within the framework of historiographical reception history.
