= Cunewalde =

Cunewalde/Kumwałd
- Municipality
- Coat of arms

- Location of Cunewalde/Kumwałd within Bautzen district
- Interactive map of Cunewalde/Kumwałd
- Location within Germany Location within Saxony
- Coordinates: 51°6′N 14°31′E
- Country: Germany
- State: Saxony
- District: Bautzen
- Subdivisions: 10

Government
  - Mayor (2020–27): Thomas Martolock (CDU)

Area
  - Total: 26.62 km^{2} (10.28 sq mi)
- Elevation: 315 m (1,033 ft)

Population (2025-12-31)
  - Total: 4,417
  - Density: 165.9/km^{2} (429.8/sq mi)
- Time zone: UTC+01:00 (CET)
  - Summer (DST): UTC+02:00 (CEST)
- Postal codes: 02733
- Dialling codes: 035877
- Vehicle registration: BZ, BIW, HY, KM
- Website: cunewalde.de

Cunewalde (German: [kuːnəˈvaldə]) or Kumwałd (Upper Sorbian) is a municipality in the district of Bautzen in the east of the federal Free State of Saxony in Germany. It lies between the cities of Bautzen and Löbau in a valley between the hills of the Czorneboh, the Hochstein and the Bieleboh, all part of the northernmost mountain ranges of the Lusatian Highlands. It is one of the more populous villages in Upper Lusatia and the longest street village in all of Germany.

== Municipal structure ==
The municipality of Cunewalde consists of the following districts:

- Cunewalde/Kumwałd
- Halbau/Jiłow
- Schönberg/Šumbark
- Weigsdorf-Köblitz/Wuhančicy-Koblica

Unofficial districts include Klipphausen, Neudorf, Zieglertal, Frühlingsberg, Bärhäuser and the Albert-Schweitzer-Siedlung.

== History ==
Cunewalde's first documentary mention dates back to 1222, but its origins may be significantly older. It is plausible that an early inhabitancy could already have existed at a street between Bautzen and the so-called "Böhmisch Zwickau" (Bohemian Zwickau) around the year 1000 or even further back. The real settlement, however, started in the 13th century when colonists from Franconia and Thuringia came to find a new place to live in this region. On the river banks of the Cunewalder Wasser, the settlers were each assigned a plot of land to cultivate as a meadow, field or forest. These individual stretches of land would have a length of up to 2.5 km (1.6 mi) each, leading to the settlement becoming a typical Waldhufendorf.

Cunewalde itself never had the misfortune of being turned into a battlefield, though its inhabitants, too, had to suffer under the consequences of some of history's great struggles. In the years between 1631 and 1633 about half of the population fell victim to an outburst of the Bubonic Plague, and in the Seven Years' War the valley of Cunewalde was used by the Austrian general Daun as a place to collect and form his army in preparation of the Battle of Hochkirch in 1758.

For the first 500 years of its history, Cunewalde consisted almost entirely of smaller and bigger farms inhabited by the local peasants. However, after the gruelling Thirty Years' War had finally come to an end in 1648, the developing handicraft became more important. It was most notably supported by exiles from Bohemia who brought with them the practice of weaving, which very quickly came to be the village's main trade. Most notably, the "Cunewalder Hemd" was famous in the region because of its astonishing quality.

At the end of the 19th century, the small weavers in their typical Upper Lusatian houses had to face a growing textile industry. Cunewalde was one of the first places in the Upper Lusatia region with big industry-buildings. During that time, the infrastructural network was also developing at a rapid pace, as a new railway-connection between Großpostwitz and Cunewalde was opened in 1890 and eventually extended to the nearby city of Löbau. The line was given up in 1998 and has since been turned into a cycle track.

== Main sights ==
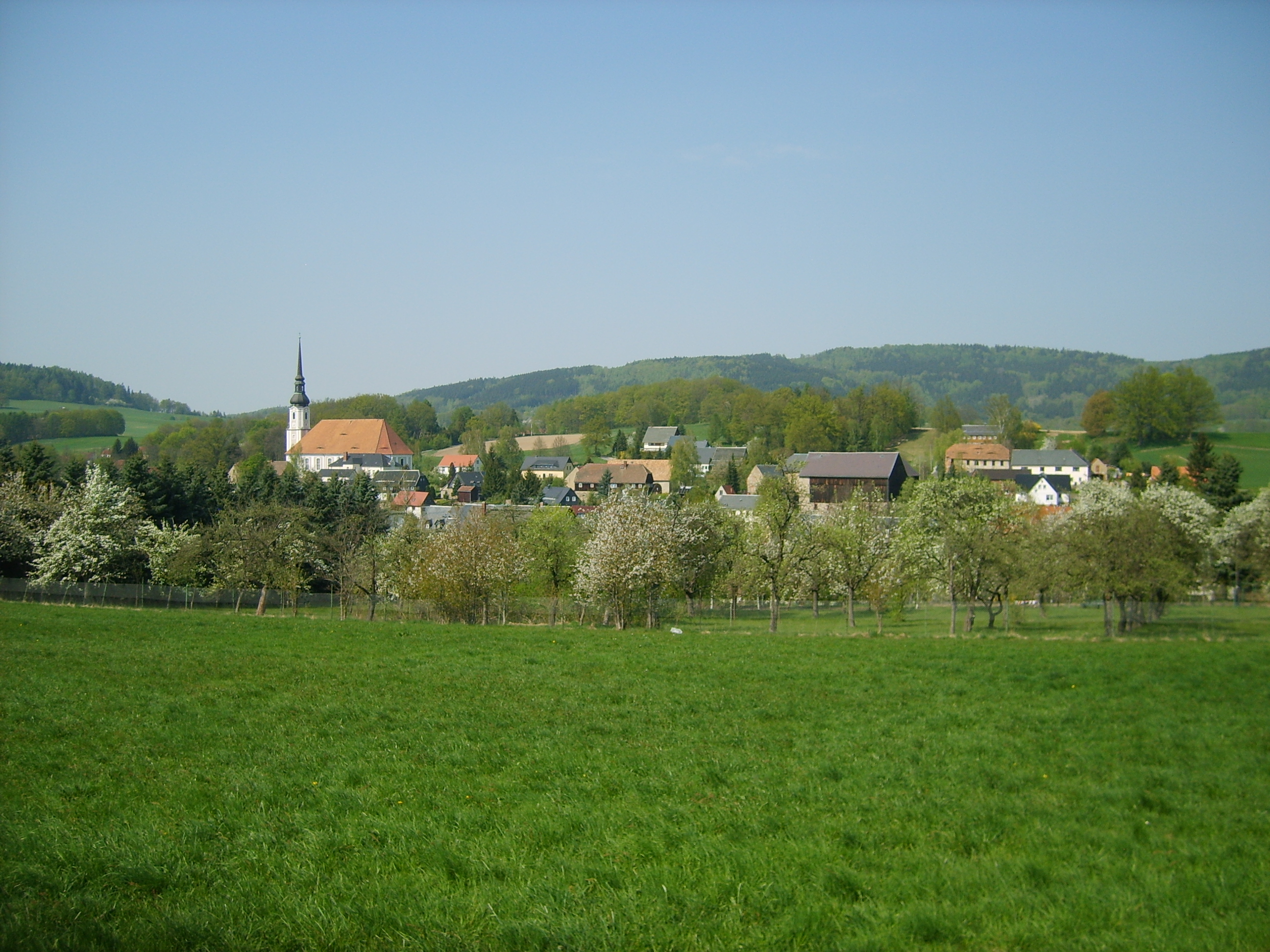
View of the main village with church

- Dorfkirche Cunewalde is Germany's biggest evangelical village church. Built from 1781 to 1783, its main hall and three galleries provide seating for up to 2632 churchgoers. The interior is characterised by three large Bohemian crystal chandeliers and a 3-manual organ from 1840.
- On the Czorneboh stands the oldest observation tower in Upper Lusatia, a stone building that was constructed in 1851.
- Cunewalde has an above average number of traditional Upper Lusatian Houses in varying but mostly good condition.
- The Polenzpark is a park that was created after the example of an English Garden with small ponds and winding paths.
- Diplomat Deutschland GmbH has been headquartered in Cunewalde since 1922.

== Twin towns ==
- (France) Donges (Saint-Nazaire)
- (Germany) Schefflenz
