= Oberoderwitzer Spitzberg =

Coordinates: 50°57′37″N 14°41′24″E

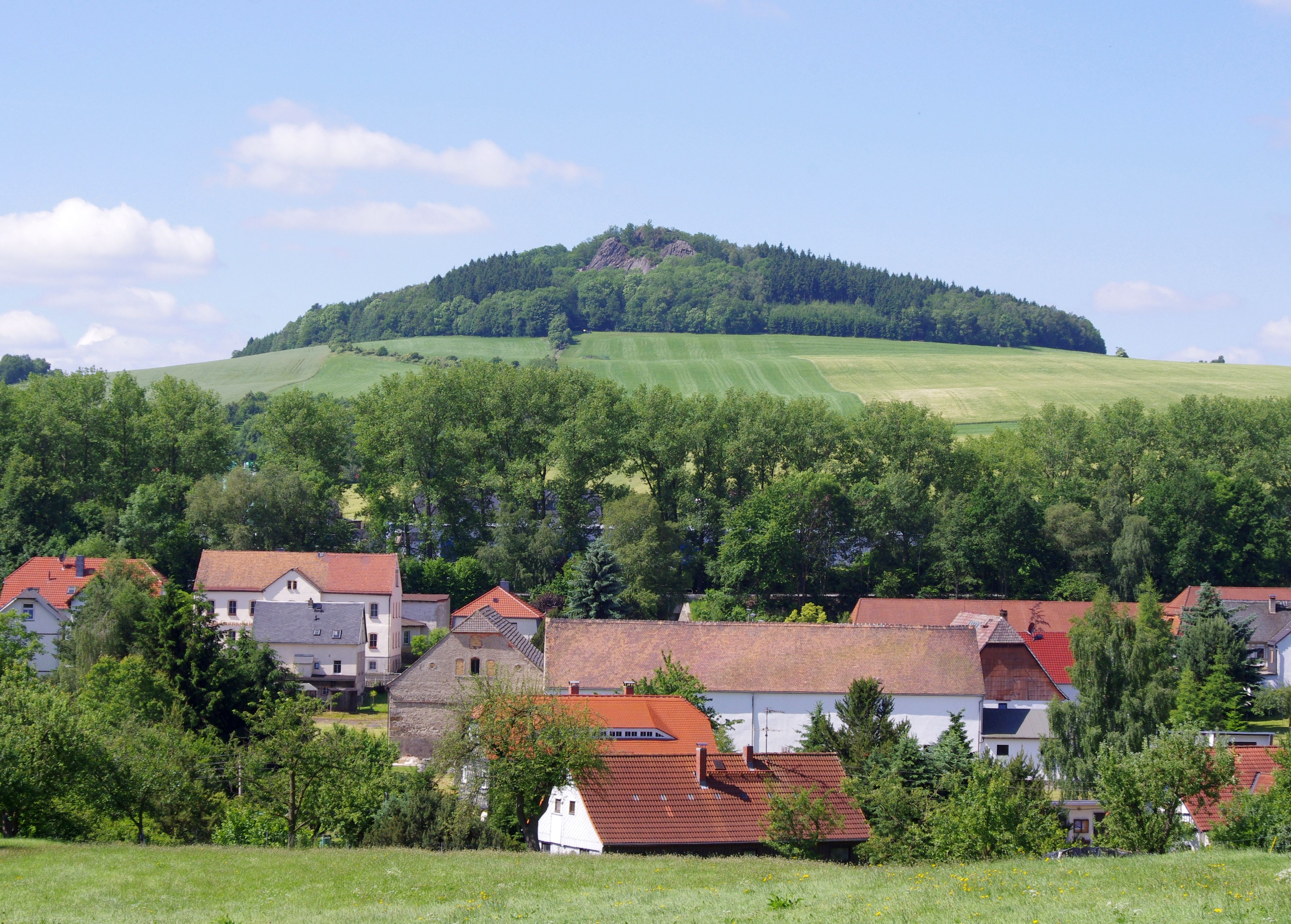
- View of Oberoderwitzer Spitzberg

Highest point
- Elevation: 510.1 m (1,674 ft)

Geography
- Location: Saxony, Germany

Oberoderwitzer Spitzberg (Upper Sorbian: Hornja Wódkowica), usually referred to on maps as Spitzberg, is a conical mountain located in the natural region of Eastern Upper Lusatia in Saxony, Germany.

The summit cliffs, composed of phonolite, have been protected as a natural monument since 1936. The area is widely known for the summer toboggan run located on the northern side of the mountain. On the summit plateau, there is a mountain hut accessible via a vehicle road. Additionally, a sport climbing area has been established on the summit rocks, featuring over 90 climbing routes.
