= Emre (Overwatch) =

Fictional character in the Overwatch franchise

Emre Sarioglu
- Overwatch character
- Emre's appearance in Overwatch
- First game: Overwatch (2026)
- Designed by: Daryl Tan; Jaejum Kim (weapon)
- Voiced by: Kerem Erdinc

In-universe information
- Class: Damage
- Origin: Istanbul, Turkey
- Nationality: Turkish

Emre Sarioglu is a character who first appeared in the 2022 video game Overwatch 2, a Blizzard Entertainment–developed first-person hero shooter, and was added to the playable roster in a 2026 update that rebranded the game back to Overwatch. A former founding member of the organization in the game's fiction, Emre left after an operation went catastrophically wrong and later resurfaced years later as a cyborg with fragmented memories of his transformation.

He was initially introduced as a minor figure in ancillary story material before being promoted to a playable hero as part of the Season 1: Conquest update, released under Blizzard's "Reign of Talon" relaunch initiative. In all appearances, Emre is voiced by Kerem Erdinc.

Media coverage surrounding Emre's release frequently emphasized his long-standing status as a teased or lightly referenced character within the franchise, as well as the comparatively straightforward, shooter-focused design of his gameplay kit. Multiple outlets drew comparisons between Emre's burst rifle and grenade-based abilities and mechanics associated with the Halo franchise, particularly its protagonist Master Chief.

== Conception and design ==
Prior to becoming playable, Emre was periodically referenced in Overwatch lore and marketing material for several years. His name first drew attention in 2018, when Blizzard released an in-universe after-action report related to an operation called "White Dome" that mentioned "Private First Class Emre Sarıoğlu," prompting speculation that he was intended as a future hero.

In 2025, Kotaku described Emre as a long-running community "enigma," noting that his sparse appearances had turned him into a recurring in-joke among fans after an animated trailer featuring Freja was widely interpreted as teasing his arrival.

== Appearances ==
Emre became playable with the Season 1: Conquest update in February 2026, released as part of Blizzard's "Reign of Talon" relaunch under the Overwatch branding. Blizzard's patch notes list him as added to the Damage hero roster. Blizzard's official hero biography lists Emre's associated location as Istanbul, Turkey, and situates him within the contemporary hero lineup.

In gameplay, Emre is classified as a Damage hero designed for offensive flexibility. He wields a three-round "Synthetic Burst Rifle" as his primary weapon, supported by abilities including a bouncing explosive grenade ("Cyber Frag"), a temporary sidearm that enhances mobility ("Siphon Blaster"), and an aiming mode ("Take Aim") that modifies weapon behavior. His passive ability, "Altered Vitals," affects how his health regeneration is triggered, while his ultimate ability, "Override Protocol," temporarily alters his offensive capabilities and weapon behavior for a limited duration.

== Critical reception ==
Critical response to Emre's release emphasized his accessibility and shooter-forward design, with several publications highlighting the clarity of his kit and its resemblance to classic first-person shooter mechanics. PC Gamer singled Emre out as one of the standout additions of the update, citing the simplicity of his burst rifle and grenade-based gameplay loop. Another strand of coverage focused on Emre's unusually prolonged development arc. Destructoid highlighted early speculation generated by the 2018 "White Dome" report, while Kotaku later characterized Emre as a long-running community meme due to the gap between his initial tease and eventual playability. GamesRadar+ noted the celebratory response from fans who had followed the character for years, including commentary from his voice actor acknowledging the long wait for his debut.

Grace Black of Vice noticed that some were disappointed with Emre's playable character design when compared to his initial appearance. While she acknowledged the passage of in-game time would result in him looking different, she observed some saw his characters taking on elements of other Overwatch characters such as Genji and Cassidy, leaving it to feel uninspiring. Black felt the original design for Emre's most notable aspect was his mohawk haircut, which she pointed out wasn't even retained in his finalized appearance, but felt this played well into his character which portrayed him almost as someone else "because he is essentially someone, or something else, now". She added that while the finalized design was still strong and conveyed important story elements, she expressed something that met more in the middle with his original appearance would have gone a long way.

Additional discussion surrounding Emre focused on his role in the broader narrative mysteries of Overwatch. In February 2026, GameRant reported on fan speculation linking Emre to "The Conspiracy," a long-running unresolved plot thread in the franchise's lore. The article highlighted a discovery made by fans examining Emre's in-game biography, which contained an encoded message that, when decoded, appeared to reference "Chernobog," a God program previously thought to be inactive within the series' fiction. GameRant noted that this discovery, combined with visual motifs on Emre’s armor and story material depicting his loss of agency, led some fans to theorize that the god program Chernobog may be influencing Emre's actions and could be connected to The Conspiracy. The outlet emphasized that these interpretations remain speculative, but suggested they could have significant implications for future storylines if addressed in official media.
