= Černíkovice (Plzeň-North District) =

- Municipality
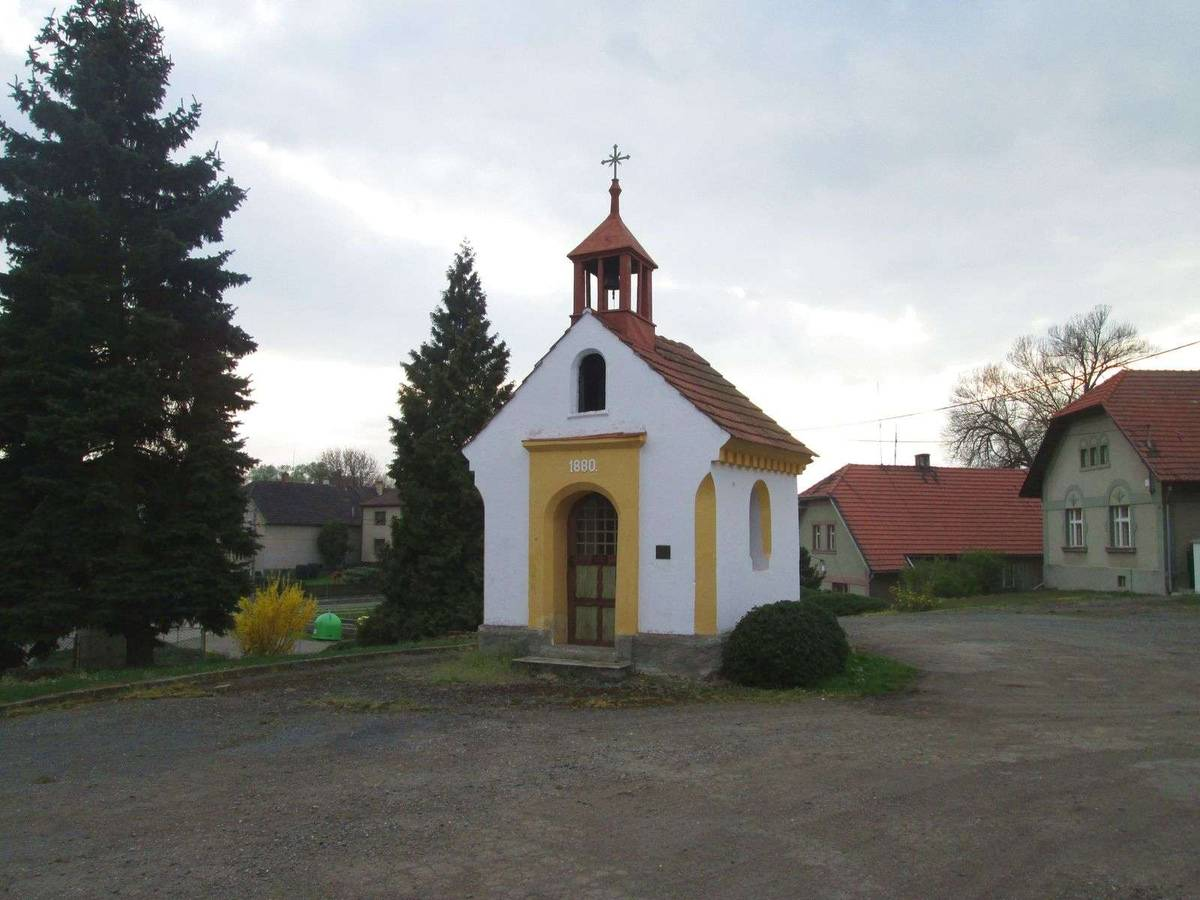
- Chapel of Saint Procopius

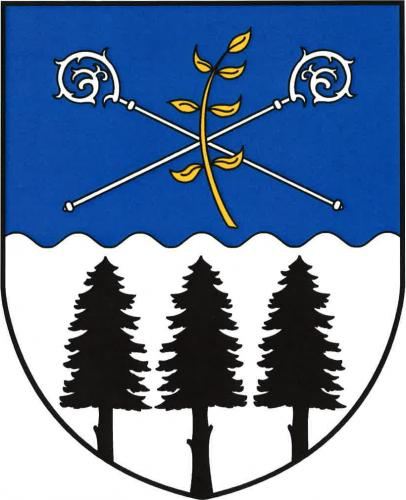
- Flag Coat of arms

- Location in the Czech Republic
- Coordinates: 49°58′32″N 13°34′1″E
- Country: Czech Republic
- Region: Plzeň
- District: Plzeň-North
- First mentioned: 1250

Area
  - Total: 3.37 km^{2} (1.30 sq mi)
- Elevation: 412 m (1,352 ft)

Population (2026-01-01)
  - Total: 96
  - Density: 28/km^{2} (74/sq mi)
- Time zone: UTC+1 (CET)
  - Summer (DST): UTC+2 (CEST)
- Postal code: 331 41
- Website: www.obec-cernikovice.cz

Černíkovice is a municipality and village in Plzeň-North District in the Plzeň Region of the Czech Republic. It has about 100 inhabitants.

Černíkovice lies approximately 29 kilometres (18 mi) north-east of Plzeň and 63 km (39 mi) west of Prague.

== Demographics ==
Historical population
Year	Pop.	±%
1869	162	—
1880	130	−19.8%
1890	148	+13.8%
1900	142	−4.1%
1910	162	+14.1%
1921	155	−4.3%
1930	133	−14.2%
1950	87	−34.6%
1961	98	+12.6%
1970	78	−20.4%
1980	71	−9.0%
1991	86	+21.1%
2001	79	−8.1%
2011	74	−6.3%
2021	80	+8.1%
Source: Censuses
