= Kuhberg =

Kuhberg may refer to the following mountains in Germany:

- Kuhberg (Dürrhennersdorf)
- Kuhberg (Stützengrün)
