= Kuhberg (Stützengrün) =

Coordinates: 50°31′08″N 12°28′57″E

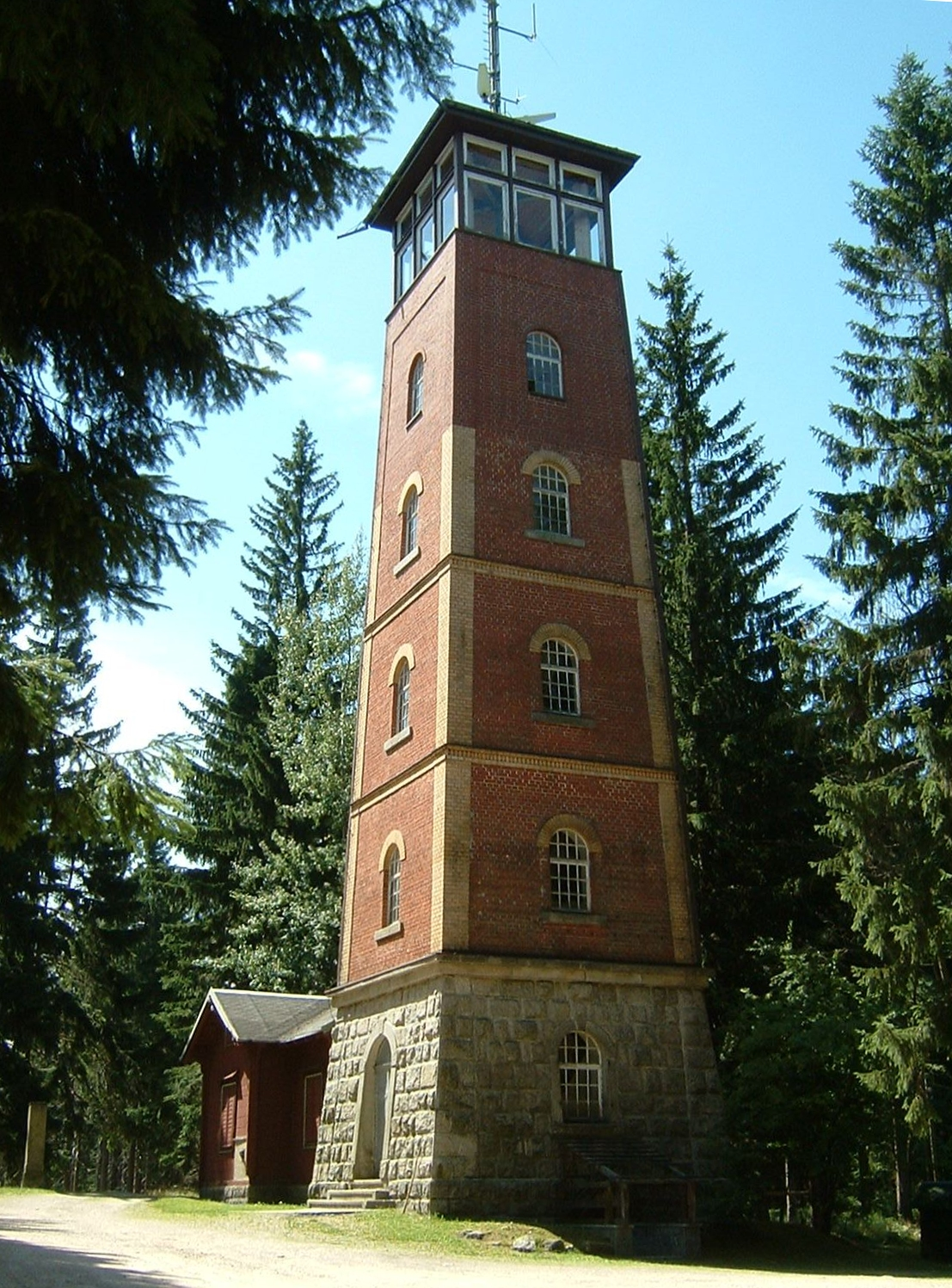
- Observation tower on Kuhberg

Highest point
- Elevation: 795 m (2,608 ft)

Geography
- Location: Saxony, Germany

Kuhberg is a mountain of Saxony, southeastern Germany.
