= Olbernhau-Grünthal–Deutschneudorf railway =

Former railway line in Germany

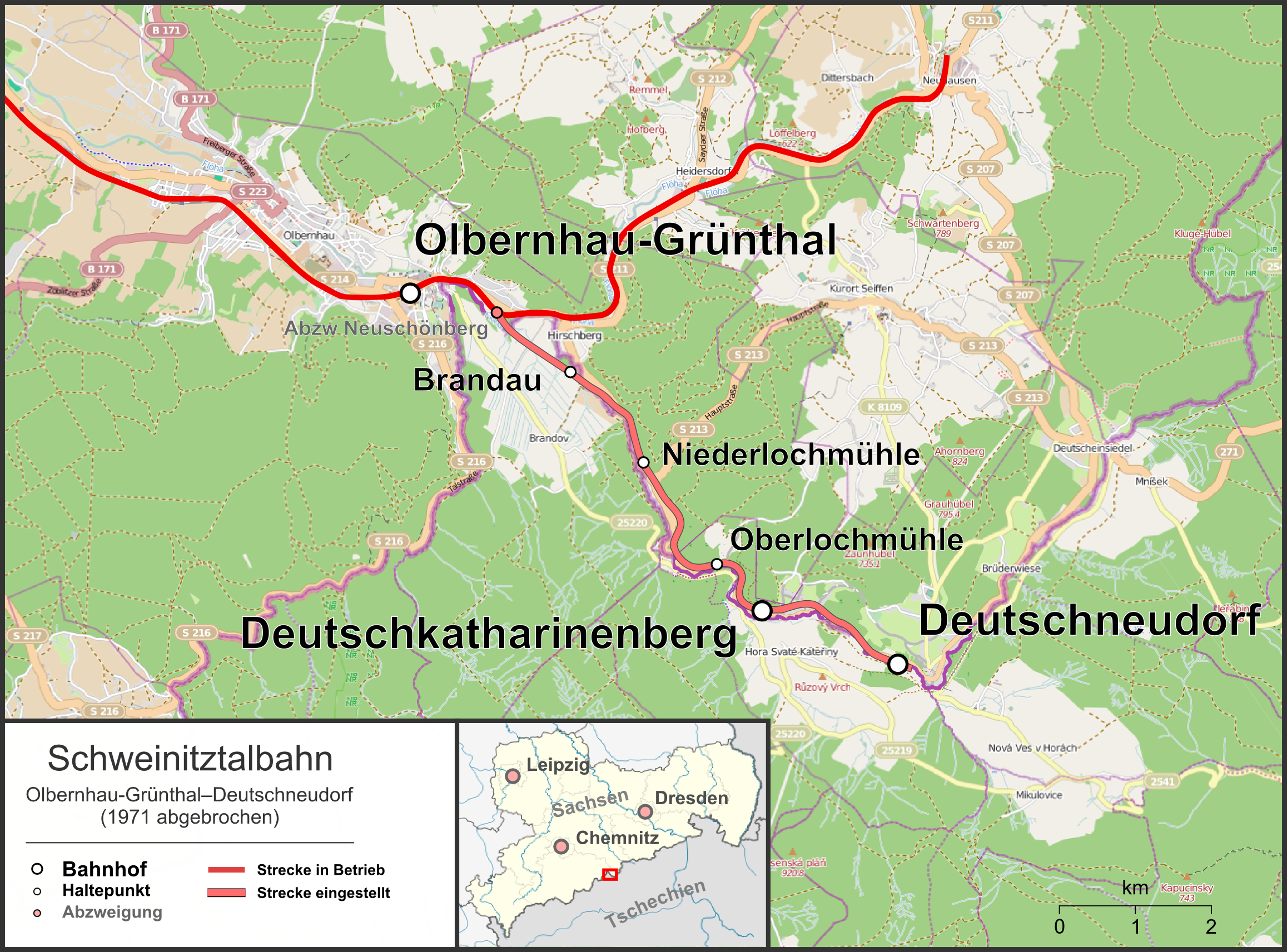
- Map of the line

Overview
- Other name: Schweinitztalbahn
- Status: dismantled
- Line number: 169b (1969)
- Locale: Saxony, North Bohemia
- Termini: Neuschönberg junction; Deutschneudorf
- Stations: 6

Service
- Type: Heavy rail
- Route number: 6670; sä. KD
- Operator: Deutsche Reichsbahn

History
- Work began: 23 June 1913
- Planned opening: 1 May 1915
- Opened: 2 May 1927
- Completed: 24 October 1924
- Passenger traffic ended: 21 May 1966
- Closed: 26 September 1969

Technical
- Line length: 8.196 km (5.093 mi)
- Character: branch line
- Track gauge: 1,435 mm (4 ft 8 1/2 in) standard gauge
- Minimum radius: 180 m
- Maximum incline: 2.5 %

The Olbernhau-Grünthal–Deutschneudorf railway, also known as Schweinitztalbahn, was a standard gauge branch line in Saxony from Olbernhau to Deutschneudorf in the Ore Mountains. For a short stretch, it also traversed Bohemia. It was opened in 1927 and closed in 1969.

== History ==
=== Initial projects ===
After the railway from Pockau to Olbernhau was opened in 1875, the communities in the valley of the Schweinitz river requested already in 1887 that a narrow-gauge branch line from Olbernhau be built towards Deutschneudorf. This project was turned down for economic reasons. The discussion was taken up anew in 1908, and in its course the Austrian side proposed to build the railway in standard gauge and to extend it over Deutschneudorf into the lignite mining area of Oberleutensdorf in North Bohemia. This line of 32.3 km length was to be built within two years at a cost of 5.78 million Mark. Saxony opposed the project because the projected stations would have been located too far from the populated places in the Schweinitz valley, and the building costs were regarded as too high.

Nevertheless, on 13 August 1913 the Royal Saxon State Railways consented to a concession for a standard gauge line from Olbernhau to Deutschneudorf, which was to be traced out as a secondary line, but with the parameters of a main line because of the expected through traffic to Bohemia. Thus, there were no level crossings at all on the whole line.

=== Construction of the line ===
Construction work started on 23 June 1914 and was to be completed by 1 May 1915. However, the outbreak of World War I delayed the work.

Since the line traversed the territory of the then Austro-Hungarian Empire between kilometres 1.86 and 2.84, a treaty dated 16 January 1916 between the countries involved regulated the conditions for the cross-border corridor traffic. In Autumn 1916 the works on the line were stopped due to the war, and the construction tracks were lifted in 1917. At this time, some of the engineering structures and the homes for the railway officials in Niederlochmühle and Deutschkatharinenberg were already finished.

Construction work resumed after World War I, but was delayed repeatedly. Only in 1924, after 10 years, the line was finished. The opening which was planned for 24 October 1924 was delayed because Czechoslovakia, founded in 1918, refused to honour the treaty of 1916 with Austria-Hungary. Only on 27 March 1927 a new treaty was signed, and the line was ceremonially opened on 2 May 1927. The opening ceremony was boycotted by the representatives of Brandau community because, although a station had been built for the village, the trains did not stop there. The reason was that there was no accommodation for a border official in Brandau, and the then German-speaking community did not wish to have a Czech-speaking official assigned. Brandau station was finally opened on 15 June 1928.

The planned extension via Katharinaberg to Wiesa-Oberleuthensdorf was postponed in 1931, and for lack of demand never taken up again.

In the Saxon scheme of railway line identifications the line was assigned the acronym KD.

== Operations ==
Originally, there were only two trains each way, illustrating the low demand for traffic. The line carried chiefly freight, so that most trains ran as mixed trains, and travel times were often very long due to shunting in Olbernhau-Grünthal and Oberlochmühle. All trains operated from or to Olbernhau station.

== Later history, decommissioning and dismantlement ==
With the annexation of Sudetenland by Germany in 1938, border control measures in Brandau stopped until the end of World War II. Afterwards, Brandau station was not served any more, and trains passed without stopping there. Instead, for some years the trains had to pass gates installed across the tracks on both sides of the section in Czechoslovakia and watched by border guards.

In 1951, the line was to be dismantled to obtain track materials for repairs elsewhere, but this did not take place. Passenger traffic continued until 21 May 1966, when it was taken over by buses, and freight traffic until the decommissioning of the line on 26 September 1969. On 12 June 1970 the line was ordered to be dismantled, and the tracks as well as the steel superstructures of the bridges were lifted subsequently.

== The line and its stations ==
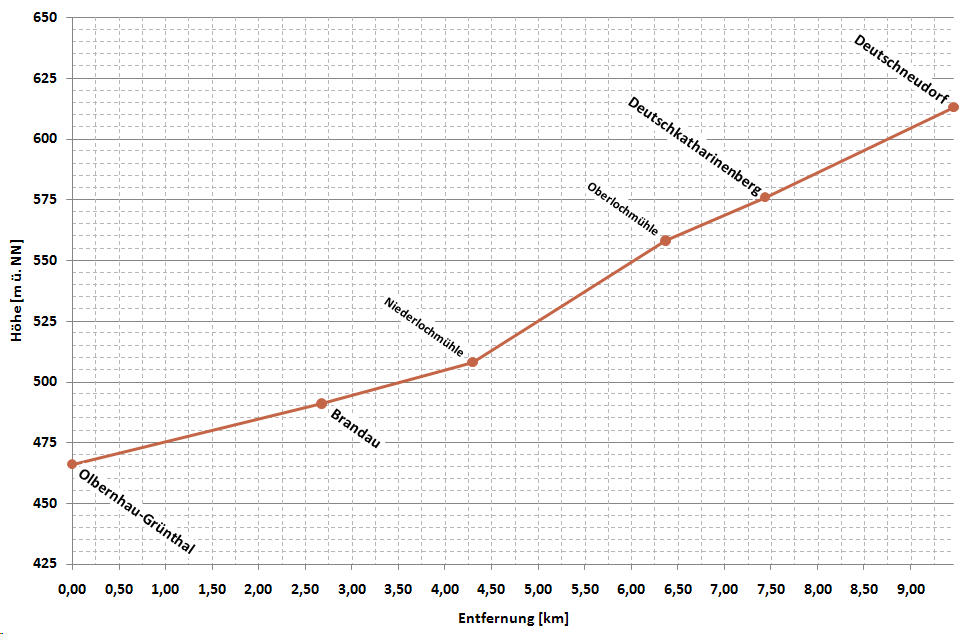
Elevation profile of the line

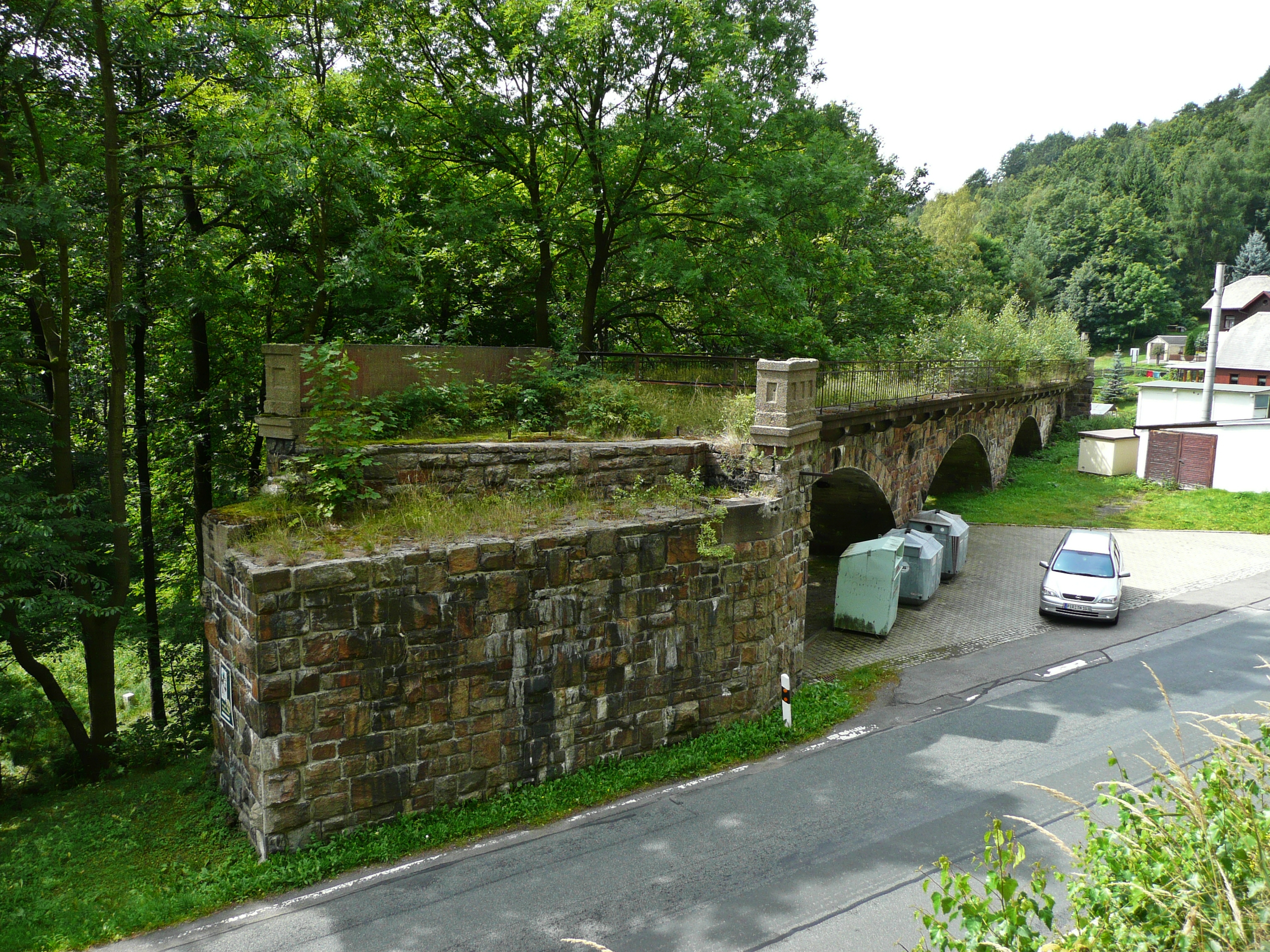
Remains of Oberlochmühle viaduct

=== Route ===
From Olbernhau to Abzweig Neuschönberg the tracks of the Pockau-Lengefeld–Neuhausen railway were used. From there, the line continued over a bridge across the river Flöha into Czechoslovak territory, which it left on a bridge across Schweinitz river. From there it led uphill on the orographically right side of the Schweinitz valley until Deutschneudorf. The end of the line, reached after another bridge across the Schweinitz, was again situated on Czechoslovak territory.

=== Stations and stops ===
==== Abzweig Neuschönberg ====
This junction was located between the stations of Olbernhau-Grünthal and Neuschönberg on the Pockau-Lengefeld–Neuhausen line (50.647843°N 13.379790°E). A solidly constructed signal box was provided which, however, was only occupied when necessitated by trains running to or from Deutschneudorf, at any other time the signals remained on "clear" for trains between Olbernhau and Neuhausen. The buildings are still standing and are used by a local allotment garden association.

==== Brandov / Brandau ====
This halt was located on Czechoslovak territory (50.639835°N 13.394925°E) and was only opened on 15 June 1928, one year after the opening of the line. The small, single-storey, half-timbered station building had a waiting room, an office, and rooms for the Czechoslovak border and customs officials. Signs were bilingual during the existence of the First Czechoslovak Republic and after World War II. Due to the changed political situation after 1945, the station was not served any more from 1945 on. The buildings were demolished around 1970.

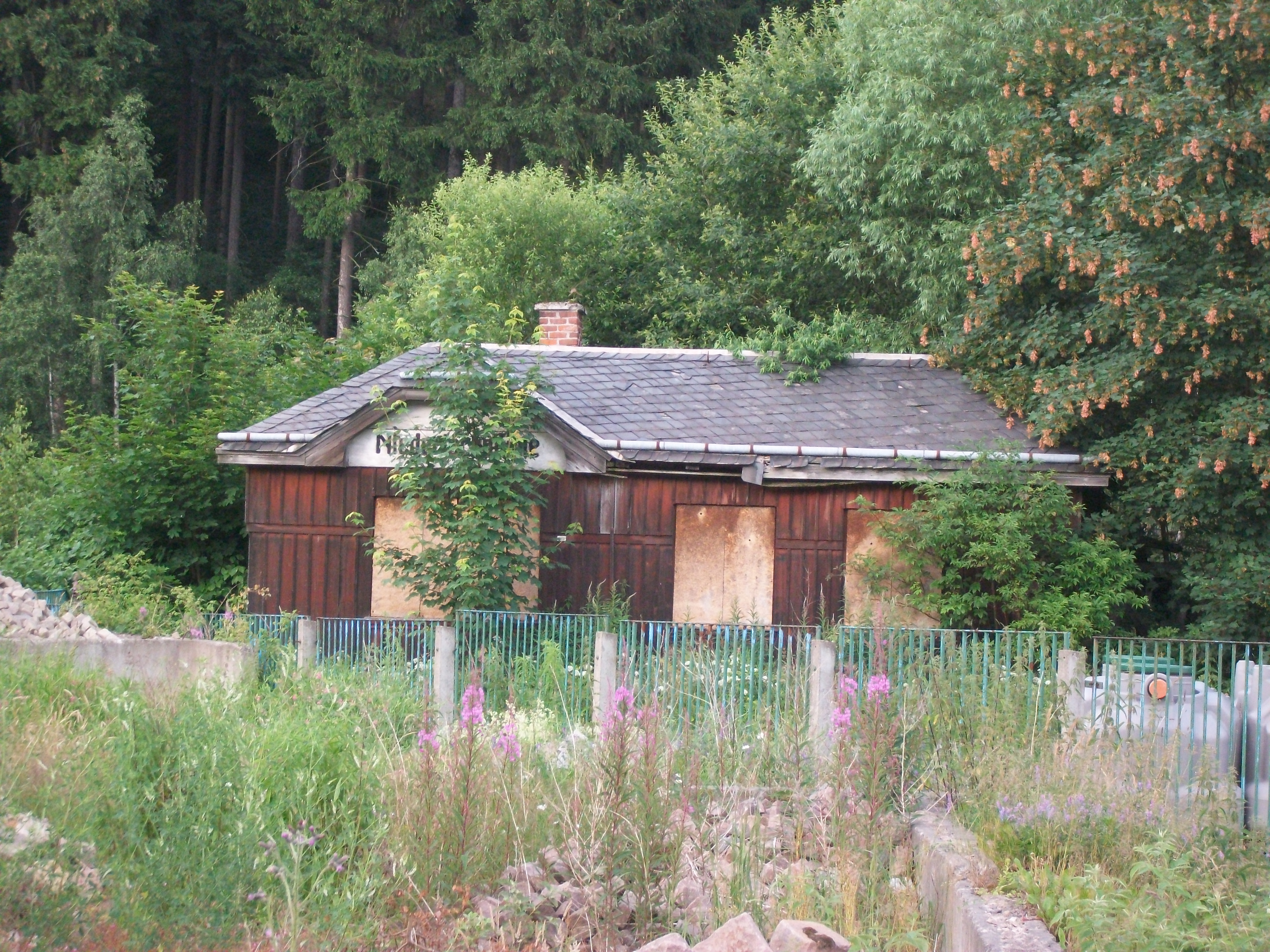
Waiting room of Niederlochmühle halt

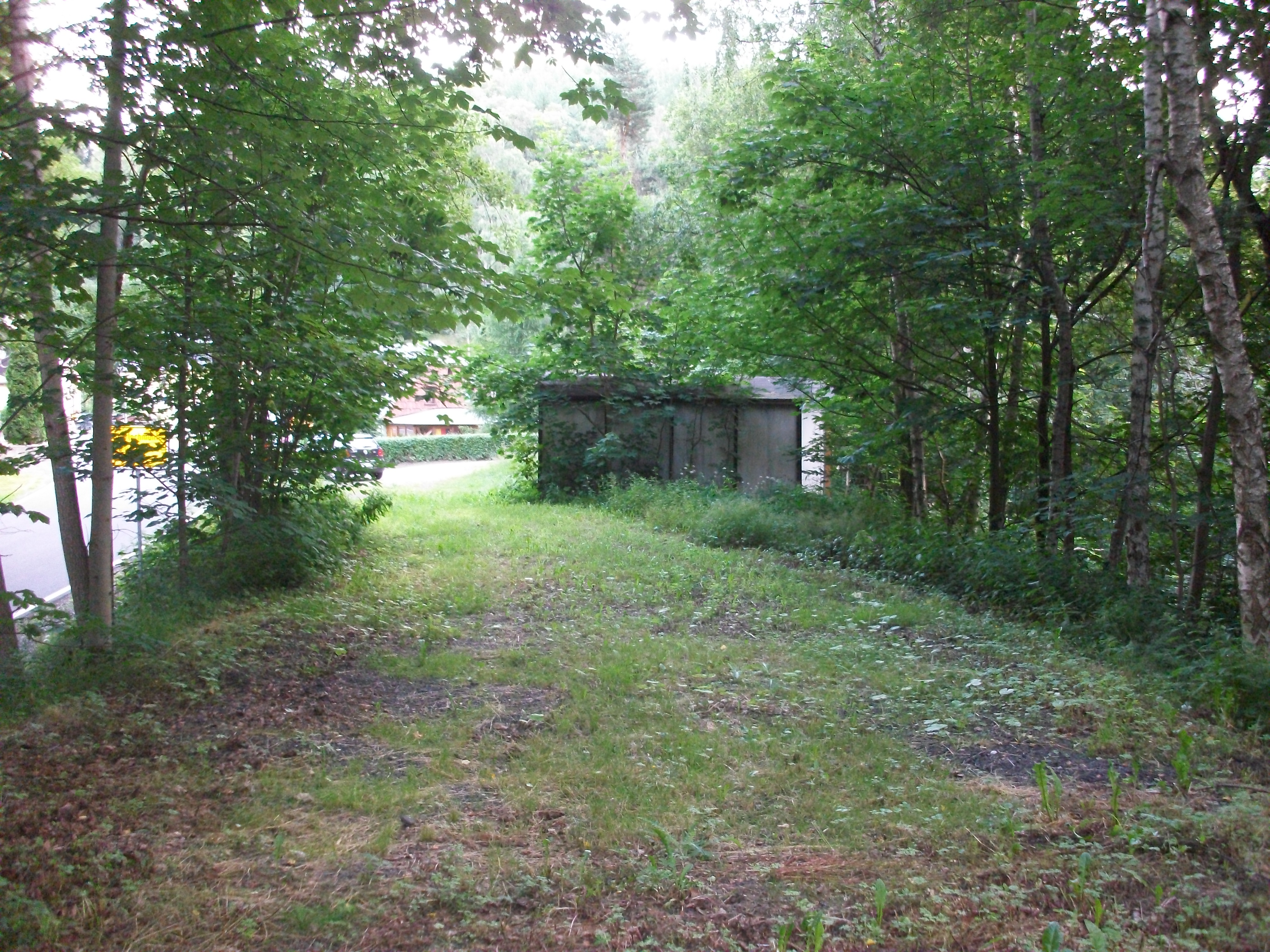
Location of Oberlochmühle halt

==== Niederlochmühle ====
This halt was located near the confluence of Seiffener Bach with Schweinitz river (50.628932°N 13.408475°E) and was equipped with a team track that was connected to the line at both ends. It was of importance for shipping products of the Seiffen toy industry. A small wooden station building and a toilet were provided, an old coach body was used as a storage room by the permanent way department.

==== Oberlochmühle ====
This was only a halt with a platform along the line (50.616736°N 13.423364°E), a waiting room in the same layout as that in Niederlochmühle that was still present in 1997, but has been demolished since, a toilet, and an old wagon body as a storage room. Until 1947 it was operated by an agent and had limited freight and parcel services, from then on it was unstaffed. Immediately after the station followed Oberlochmühle viaduct, the largest bridge on the line.

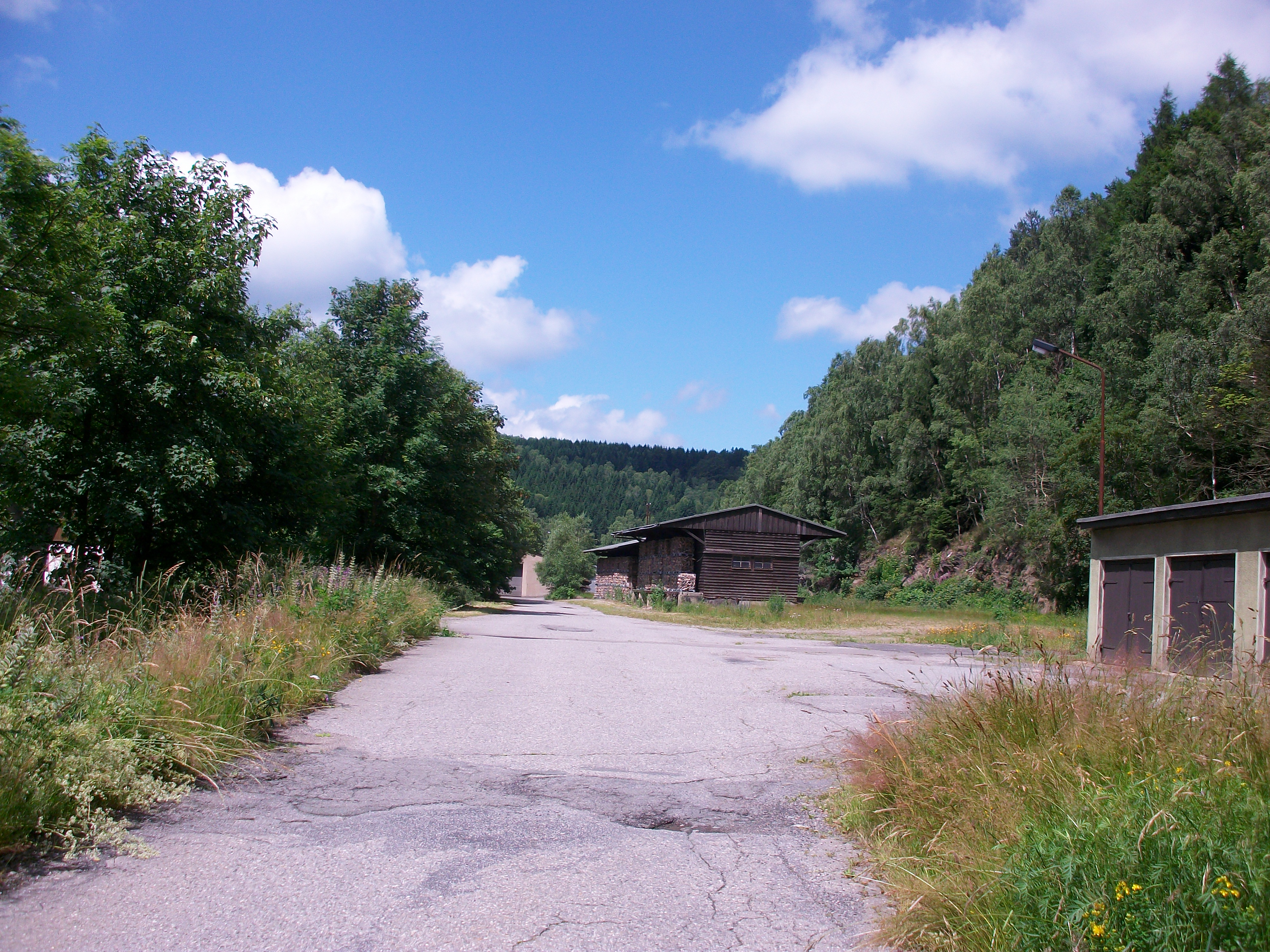
Goods shed in Deutschkatharinenberg

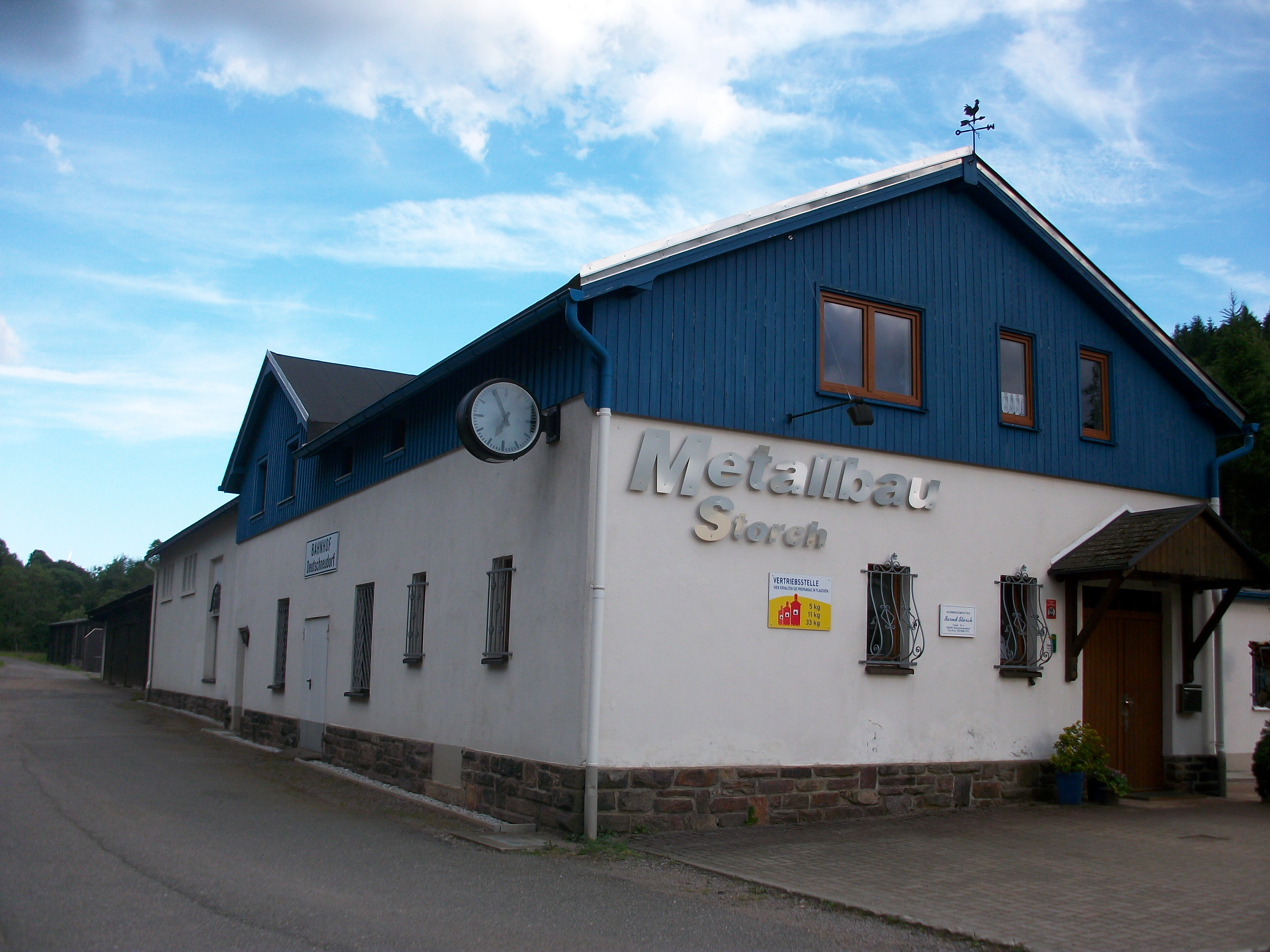
Station building of Deutschneudorf, now the seat of a metal working enterprise

==== Deutschkatharinenberg ====
Staffed until 1933, this station had four tracks and eight sets of points, a waiting room with office, a toiled, and a goods shed next to the team tracks (50.611231°N 13.431414°E). It was the largest intermediate station on the line. A house with accommodations for railway workers was located across Talstraße street on the bank of Schweinitz river.

==== Industrial spur Zimmermann & Co. ====
This was the only industrial spur branching off the line between stations (50.611710°N 13.438208°E). It consisted of a team track with a safety point and was served until the final closure of the line to freight on 26 September 1969 by local goods trains. Incoming freight consisted mainly of coal, outgoing freight of the produce of the firm.

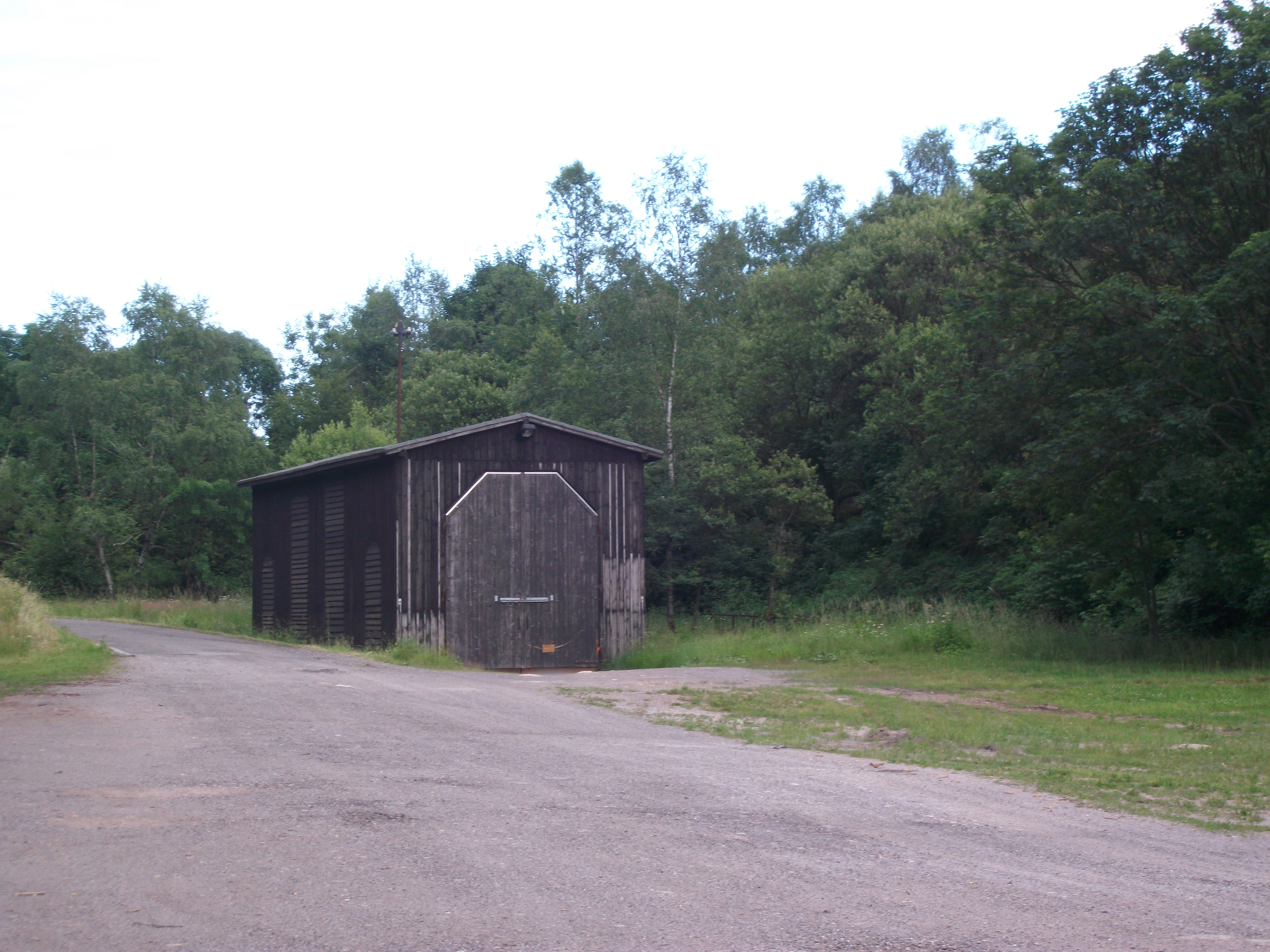
Locomotive shed in Deutschneudorf

==== Deutschneudorf ====
The terminus of the line (50.605137°N 13.455948°E) stretched into Czechoslovak territory. In particular, its turnout track across the border was a preparatory work for the extension to Wiesa-Oberleutensdorf that was discussed several times. The station had four through tracks and ten sets of points in total. Buildings were limited to the stone-built station building with attached goods shed and a single-stand locomotive shed. From 1938 to 1945, the loading stage for J. A. Wagner, manufacturer of wooden goods, was located across the border on the turnout track.

== Literature ==
- Günter Baldauf (2007). "Vor 80 Jahren wurde die Schweinitztalbahn eröffnet". Erzgebirgische Heimatblätter (3): 13–15. ISSN 0232-6078.
- Stephan Häupel (2008). Die Eisenbahn im Flöhatal und ihre regelspurigen Zweigstrecken. Witzschdorf: Bildverlag Böttger. ISBN 978-3-937496-08-5.
- Thomas Böttger (2008). Erzgebirgsverein e. V. (ed.). "Aus der Geschichte der Schweinitztalbahn". Jahrbuch für das Erzgebirge 2009. Schneeberg. ISBN 978-3-931770-77-8.
