= Pockau-Lengefeld station =

Railway station in Pockau-Lengefeld, Germany

Pockau-Lengefeld
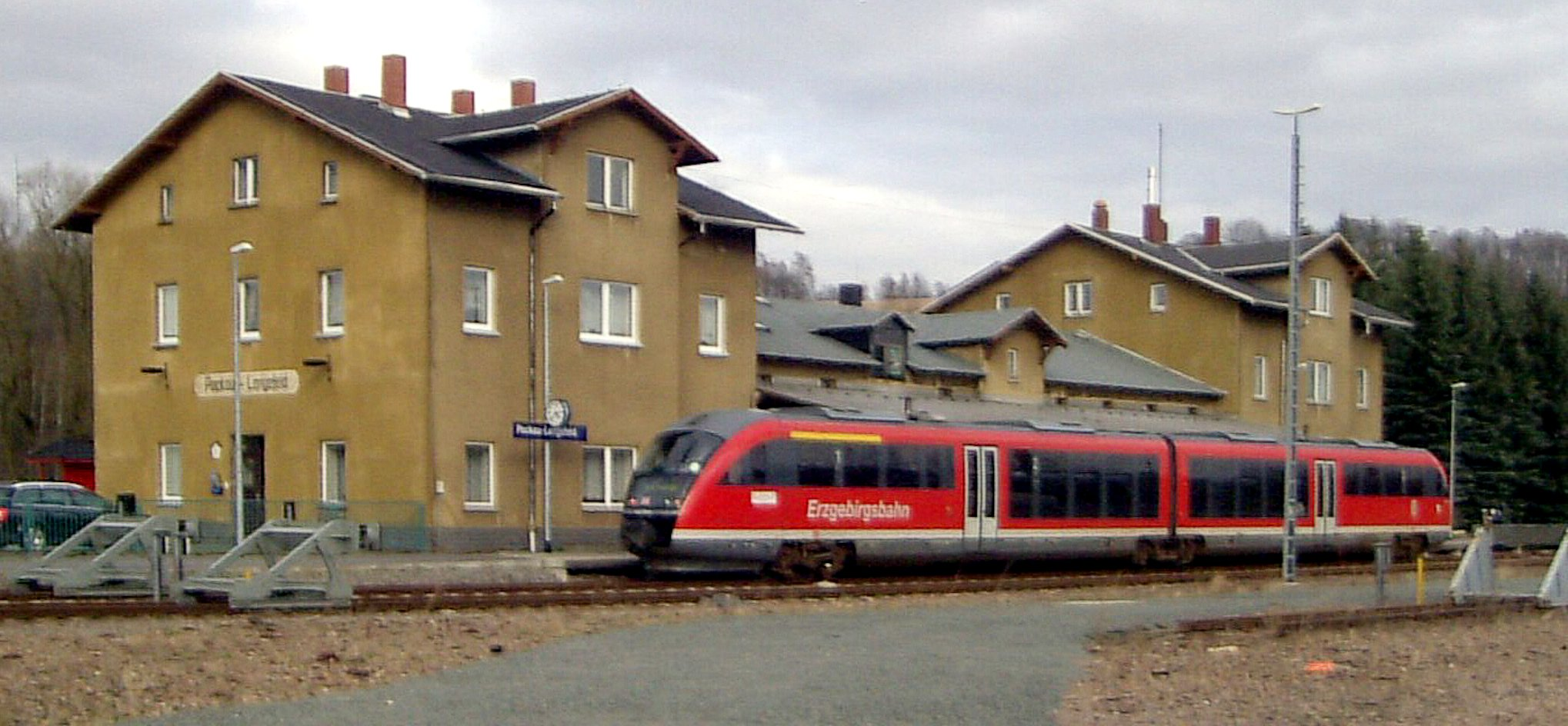
- Erzgebirgsbahn DMU in front of the entrance building

General information
- Location: Pockau-Lengefeld, Saxony; Germany
- Coordinates: 50°42′24″N 13°13′38″E
- System: Junction station
- Lines: Pockau-Lengefeld–Neuhausen (Erzgeb) (km 0.037); Reitzenhain–Flöha (km 31.225)
- Platforms: 3

Construction
- Accessible: Yes

Other information
- Station code: n/a
- DS100 code: DPF
- IBNR: 8010277
- Website: www.bahnhof.de

History
- Opened: 15 February 1875
Location

Pockau–Lengefeld station is a local railway junction in Pockau-Lengefeld in the German state of Saxony. The Pockau-Lengefeld–Neuhausen railway branches off the Reitzenhain–Flöha railway here. The station and lines were opened in 1875.

Today, the station has lost much of its former importance, the former Pockau-Lengefeld locomotive depot was closed in the 2000s. No passenger traffic has taken place on the Pockau-Lengefeld-Marienberg section since 2013. Erzgebirgsbahn operates services hourly from Monday to Friday with gaps at noon and in the evening on the Chemnitz–Flöha–Pockau-Lengefeld–Olbernhau route. On weekends, it generally runs every two hours.

== History ==
The first serious proposals for railway construction in the Flöha valley and the area around Marienberg were put forward in the 1860s. The Chemnitz-Komotauer Eisenbahngesellschaft (Chemnitz-Chomutov Railway Company) was founded in 1871 and in the same year began the first preparations for the Reitzenhain–Flöha and Pockau-Lengefeld–Olbernhau lines. Although it was known as Pockau-Lengefeld from the outset, the station was completely in the Pockau area, while the town of Lengefeld is on a mountain range far from the station in the Flöha valley.

Even before the end of the construction, the station opened for goods traffic on 15 February 1875. The opening ceremony of the Marienberg–Flöha section for passenger transport took place on 24 May 1875. The branch to Olbernhau was also opened in the same year. After considerable financial losses, the Saxon state bought the Chemnitz-Chomutov Railway Company in 1876.

The station was designed as an Inselbahnhöfe (island station, that is surrounded by rail tracks) and was expanded several times over the following decades. While there had been a total of eight tracks (five to the south and three to the north of the entrance building) before 1896, the station had 19 tracks in 1940 (ten to the south and nine to the north of the station building).

After the end of the Second World War, small changes to the track layout were gradually implemented; this ended in a radical reconstruction of the station in 2005/2006. At the same time, the remaining tracks were reduced to five. Since then, through passages have been possible only on the northern side, because all three remaining tracks on the southern side terminate.

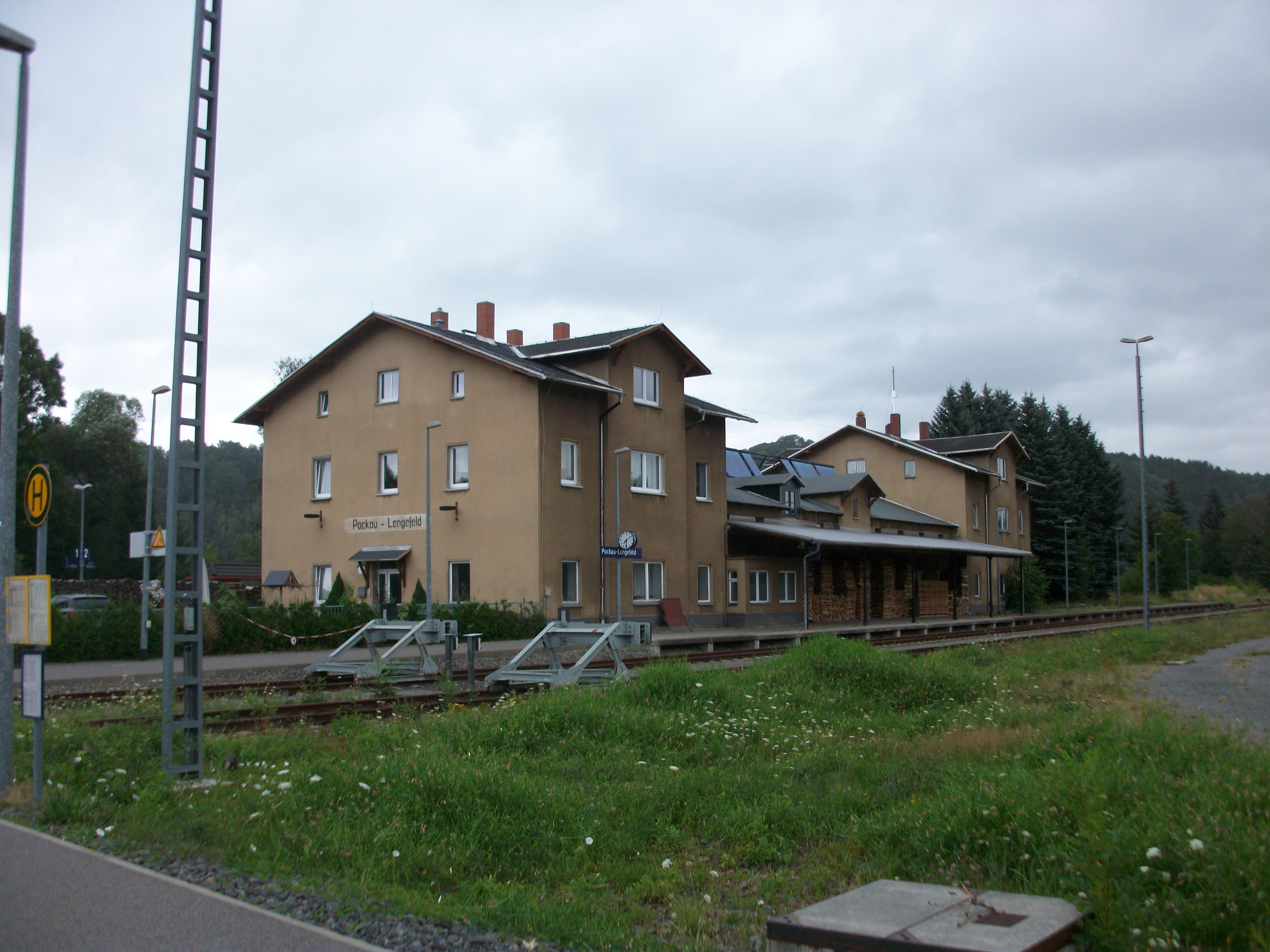
Pockau-Lengefeld station, south side (2016)

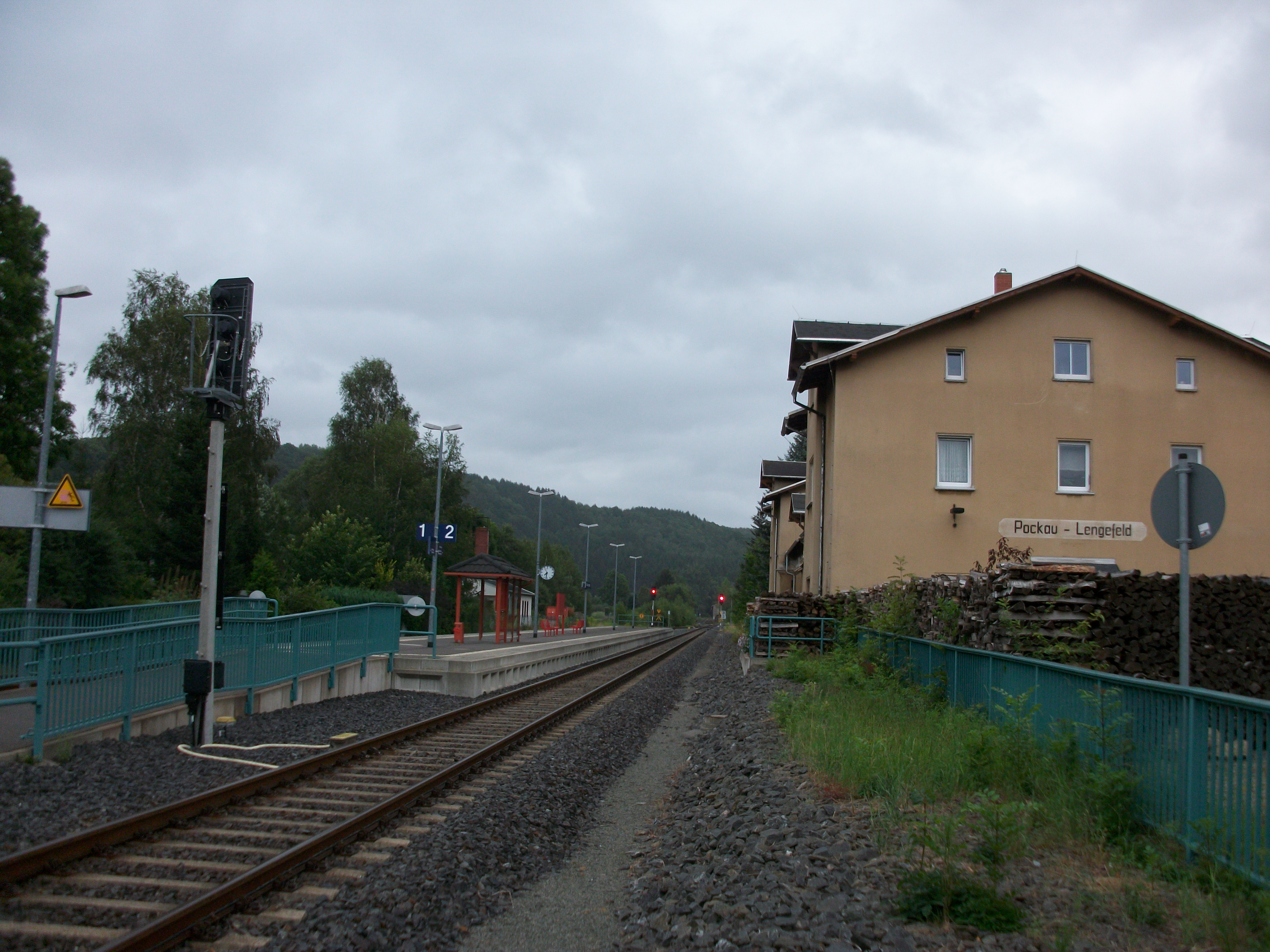
Pockau-Lengefeld station, north side (2016)

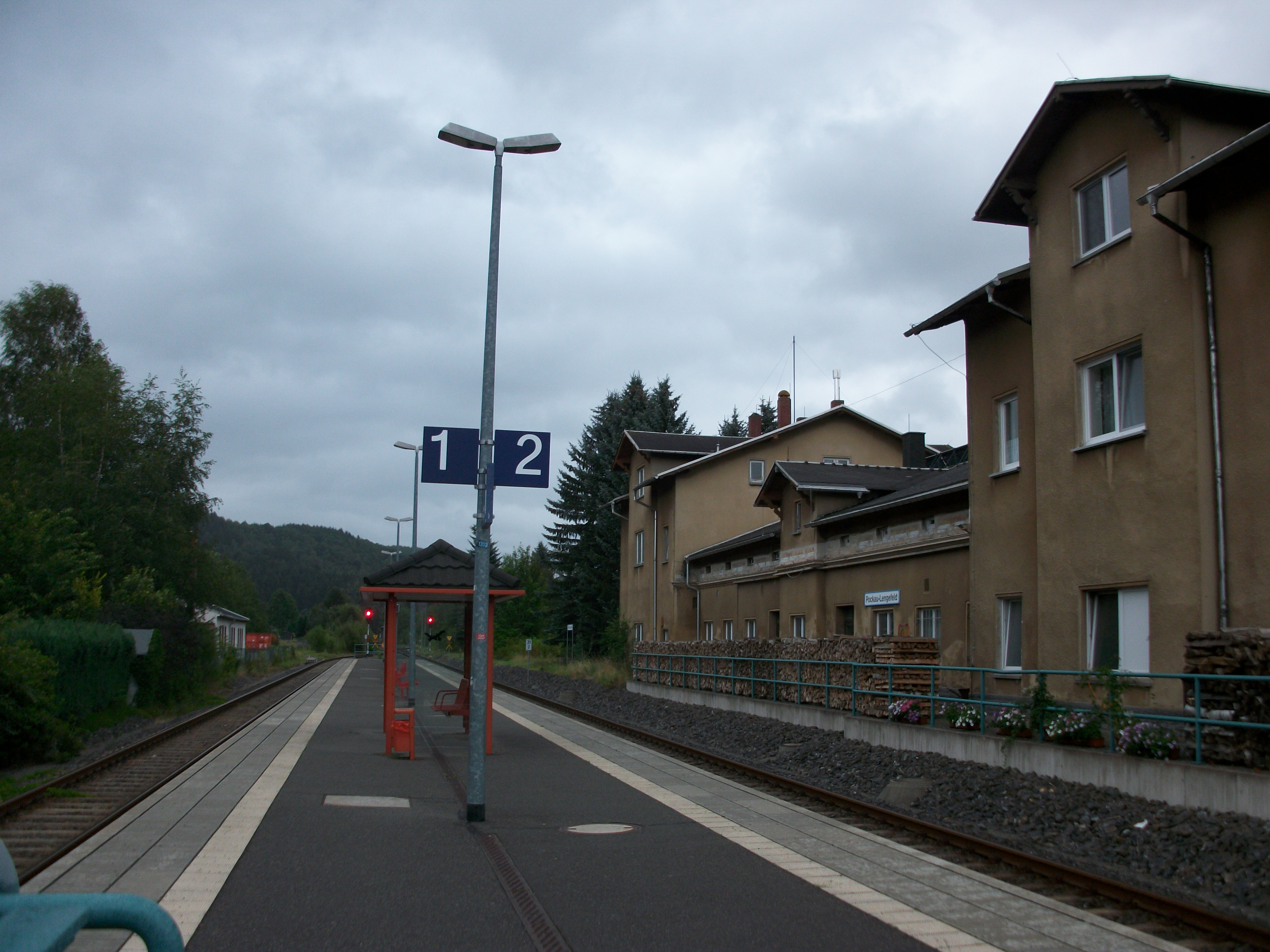
Pockau-Lengefeld station, north side (2016)

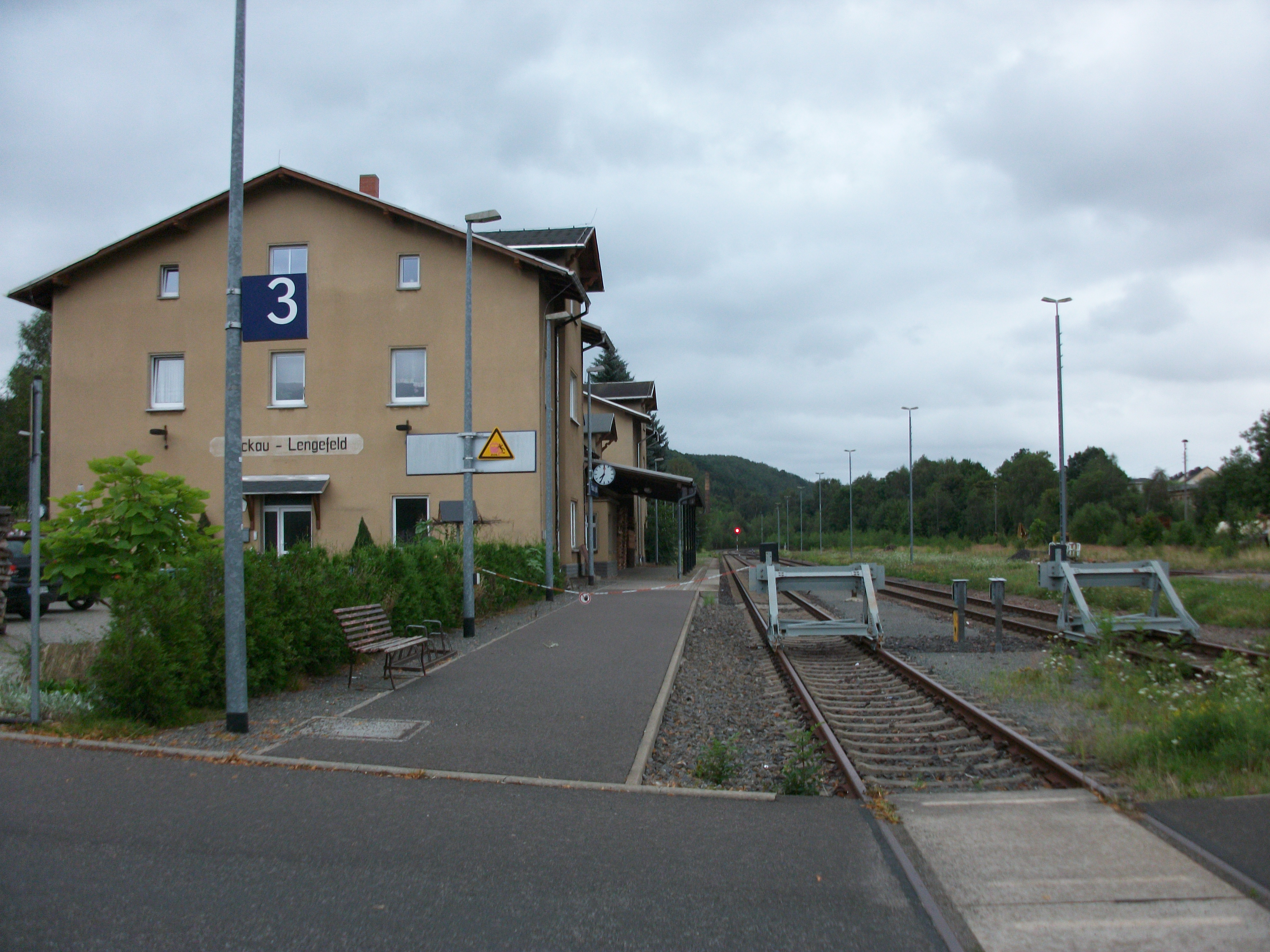
Pockau-Lengefeld station, line to Marienberg (2016)

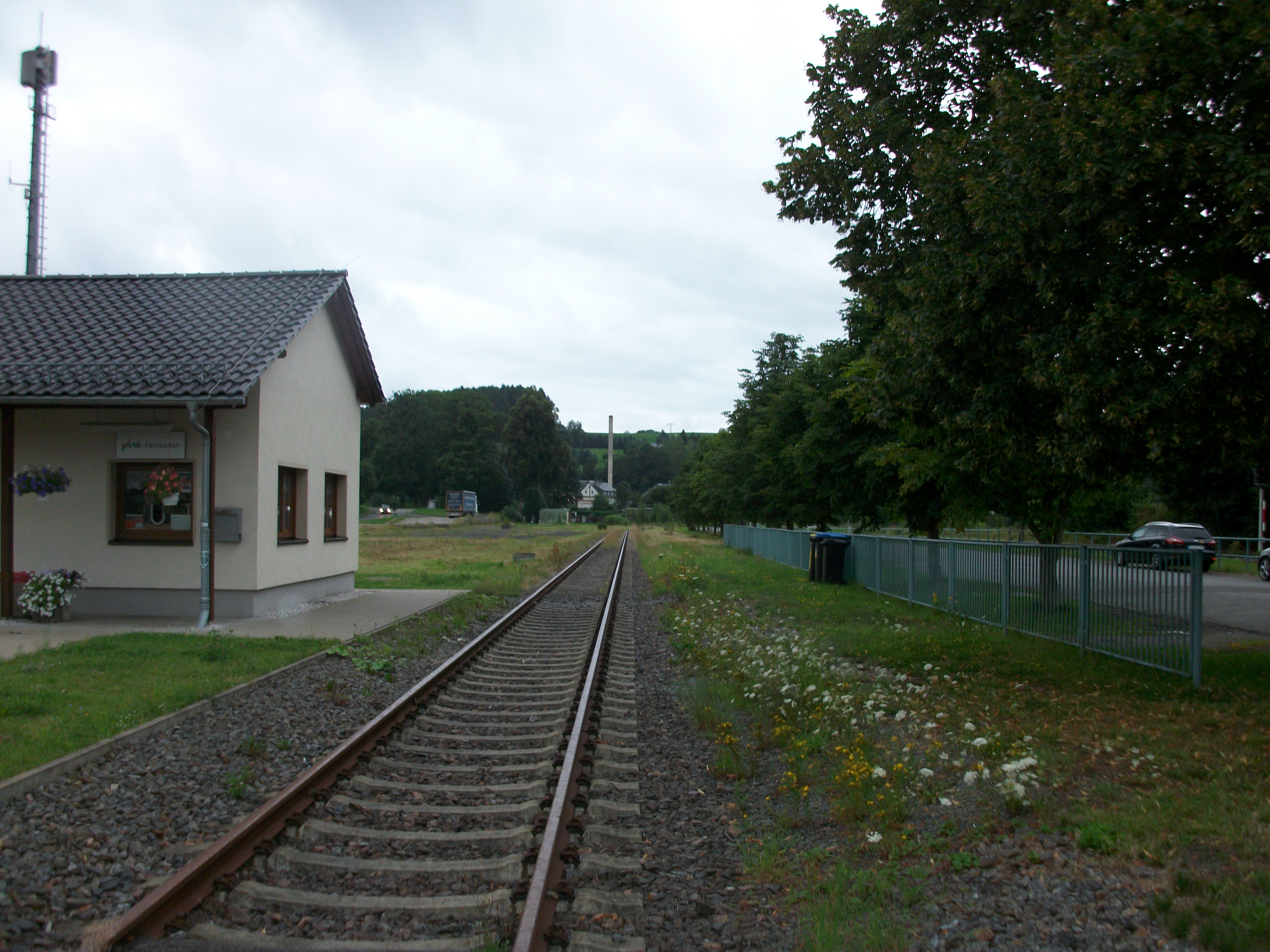
Pockau-Lengefeld station, siding on the south side (2016)

== Pockau-Lengefeld locomotive depot ==
During the construction of the railway, a roundhouse where locomotives were heated (Heizhaus, literally "heating house") with a 12 m turntable was built in Pockau-Lengefeld on the eastern side of the station and a large workshop with three tracks was also built. On 1 January 1937, the Pockau-Lengefeld locomotive depot (Bahnbetriebswerk, Bw) was founded with 75 employees; it was one of the smallest locomotive depots in the Dresden railway division (Reichsbahndirektion Dresden).

On 1 January 1966, the locomotive depot was dissolved and integrated as a locomotive service centre of the Karl-Marx-Stadt-Hilbersdorf locomotive depot. As a result, the depot’s responsibility changed very little, only major repairs were carried out in Hilbersdorf from then on. A "central workshop for fixtures and work equipment" was also built in Pockau-Lengefeld. When, in 1970, the numbering of Deutsche Reichsbahn's trainsets was converted to a computerised numbering system, almost all the new number plates for Deutsche Reichsbahn’s locomotives were made here.

After 1989/90, the locomotive service centre lost a lot of importance, the workshop was closed in 1995 and the other depot facilities were used for the last time in 2001. The track connection was removed during the station reconstruction in 2006 and the empty buildings have decayed increasingly since.
