= Flöha Valley Railway =

The Flöha Valley Railway (German: Flöhatalbahn) may refer to one of two railways in the Flöha Valley:

- Reitzenhain–Flöha railway
- Pockau-Lengefeld–Neuhausen railway
