= Pockau-Lengefeld–Neuhausen railway =

Railway line in Germany

Pockau-Lengefeld–Neuhausen (Erzgeb)

Overview
- Line number: 6618
- Locale: Saxony, Germany
- Termini: Pockau-Lengefeld; Neuhausen (Erzgeb)

Service
- Route number: 519

Technical
- Line length: 22.082 km (13.721 mi)
- Track gauge: 1,435 mm (4 ft 8 1/2 in) standard gauge
- Minimum radius: 234 m (768 ft)
- Operating speed: 80 km/h (49.7 mph) (maximum)
- Maximum incline: 1.25%

The Pockau-Lengefeld–Neuhausen railway, one of two lines also called the Flöha Valley Railway (German: Flöhatalbahn), is a branch line in the German state of Saxony. It runs in the valley of the Flöha from Pockau via Olbernhau to Neuhausen. Since 2001, the route has been operated by Erzgebirgsbahn, part of Deutsche Bahn's RegioNetz subsidiary.

== History ==
A railway into the upper Flöha valley and to Marienberg was already under consideration in 1863, when the construction of the railway from Chemnitz to Freiberg was debated. Initially, a route south of the current one was planned to connect towns in the Ore Mountains to the railway network. When these plans were abandoned, a railway through the Flöha valley via Olbernhau to Chomutov (German: Komotau; then in the Austrian Empire and from 1867 in Austria-Hungary, now in the Czech Republic) was considered. At the same time, a committee for the construction of a railway via Marienberg and Reitzenhain to Komotau was established in Marienberg. Thus, in 1867 two projects were in competition for the concession to build a railway in the Flöha Valley. After the Buschtěhrader Eisenbahn (Buštěhrad Railway) and the town of Chomutov expressed their preference for a line via Marienberg, this route was given priority. The Saxon government approved of the concession with the condition that the line was to be built using private, non-government funds.

The Chemnitz-Komotauer Eisenbahngesellschaft (Chemnitz-Chomutov Railway Company) was formed on 15 August 1871 with the aims of constructing and operating the line. The railway construction company Pleßner & Co. of Berlin was tasked with the execution of the construction work.

=== Construction of line to Olbernhau ===
The first sod was turned on 22 February 1872. Italian workers also took part in the construction because of their extensive experience in stonework. The economical crisis of 1873 caused economical difficulties for the construction company, so that the railway company was forced to take over the completion. Construction of the railway was finished in early 1875.

Because of financial losses, the Chemnitz-Komotauer Eisenbahngesellschaft had to sell the line to the Saxon state after only one year of operation. On 4 December 1876 it was transferred into the ownership of the Royal Saxon State Railways who operated the line from then on.

=== Extension to Neuhausen ===
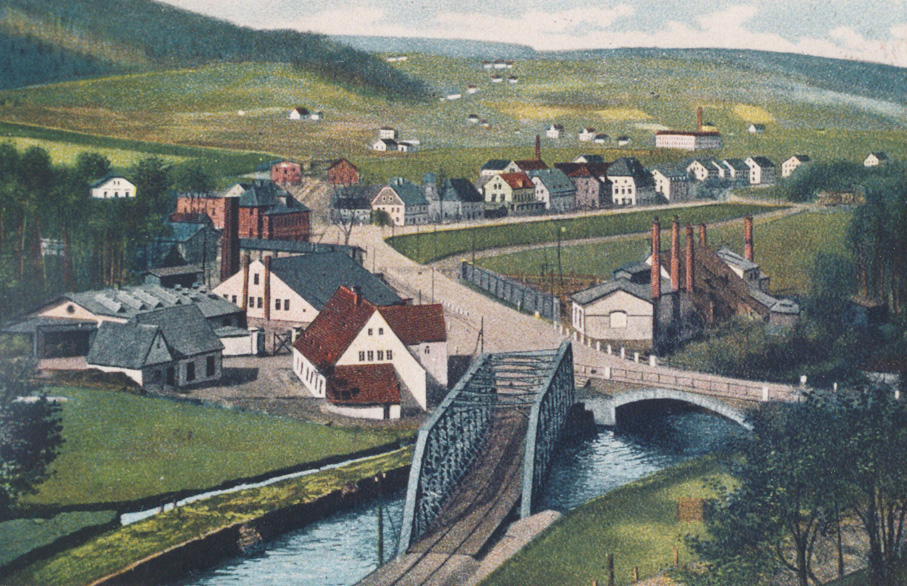
View from Oberneuschönberg towards Olbernhau with the bridge over the Flöha in Olbernhau-Grünthal in the foreground (around 1900)

A petition had already been submitted calling for an extension of the line in 1883. The project, which was being developed at the time, foresaw a narrow gauge railways from Olbernhau via Sayda to Bienenmühle to connect with the Nossen–Moldava v Krušných horách railway. The project was pursued in particular by Neuhausen pastor Dr. Süß and the Sayda railway committee. In July 1890, the Saxon Finance Ministry examined the situation in the Flöha valley and presented its own project in the autumn of 1891 which only provided only for a branch line from Olbernhau to Neuhausen, but in standard gauge. The two chambers of the Saxon Landtag agreed to the project in February 1892.

Preparatory work for the construction of the line started in 1892, and the actual construction on the line in October 1893. It took about two years, until the autumn of 1895, to finish. A total of 13,541 metres of track with 39 sets of points were laid. On 24 September 1895, the official inspection took place and found no defects. On 30 September 1895, the line was officially opened with a special train for invited guests. Scheduled passenger operations with four daily pairs of trains on the Pockau-Lengefeld–Neuhausen route commenced on 1 October 1895.

On 3 May 1927, the branch line from Olbernhau-Grünthal to Deutschneudorf (Schweinitztalbahn, Schweinitz Valley Railway) was opened. This line was closed in 1969.

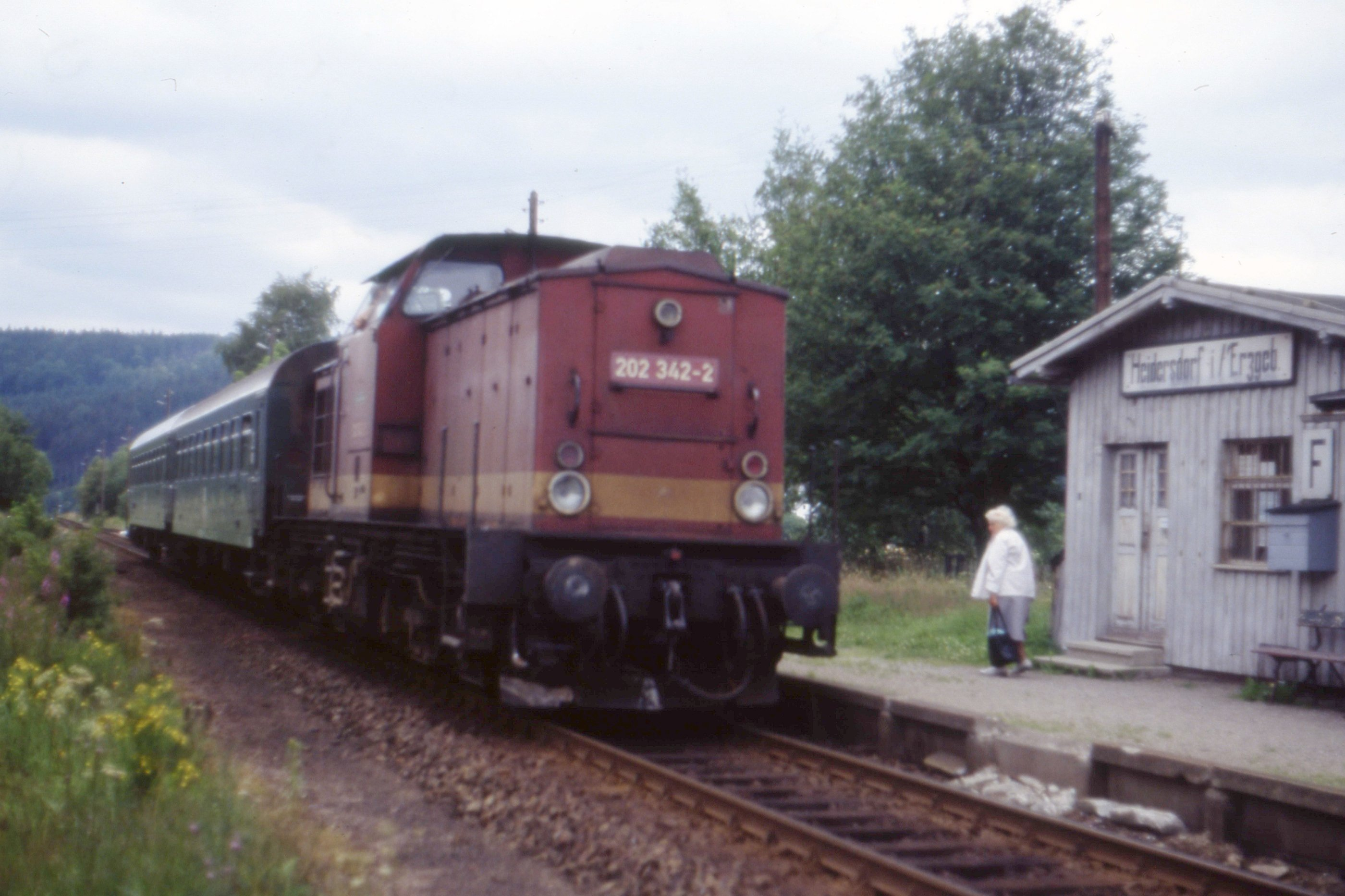
Passenger train with class 110 diesel locomotive and reconstructed carriages at Heidersdorf station (1993)

Freight operations on the section between Olbernhau-Grünthal and Neuhausen ceased on 1 January 1994. Passenger services operated until 9 June 2001, after which the route was closed due to the poor state of the tracks.

=== Redevelopment and the present ===
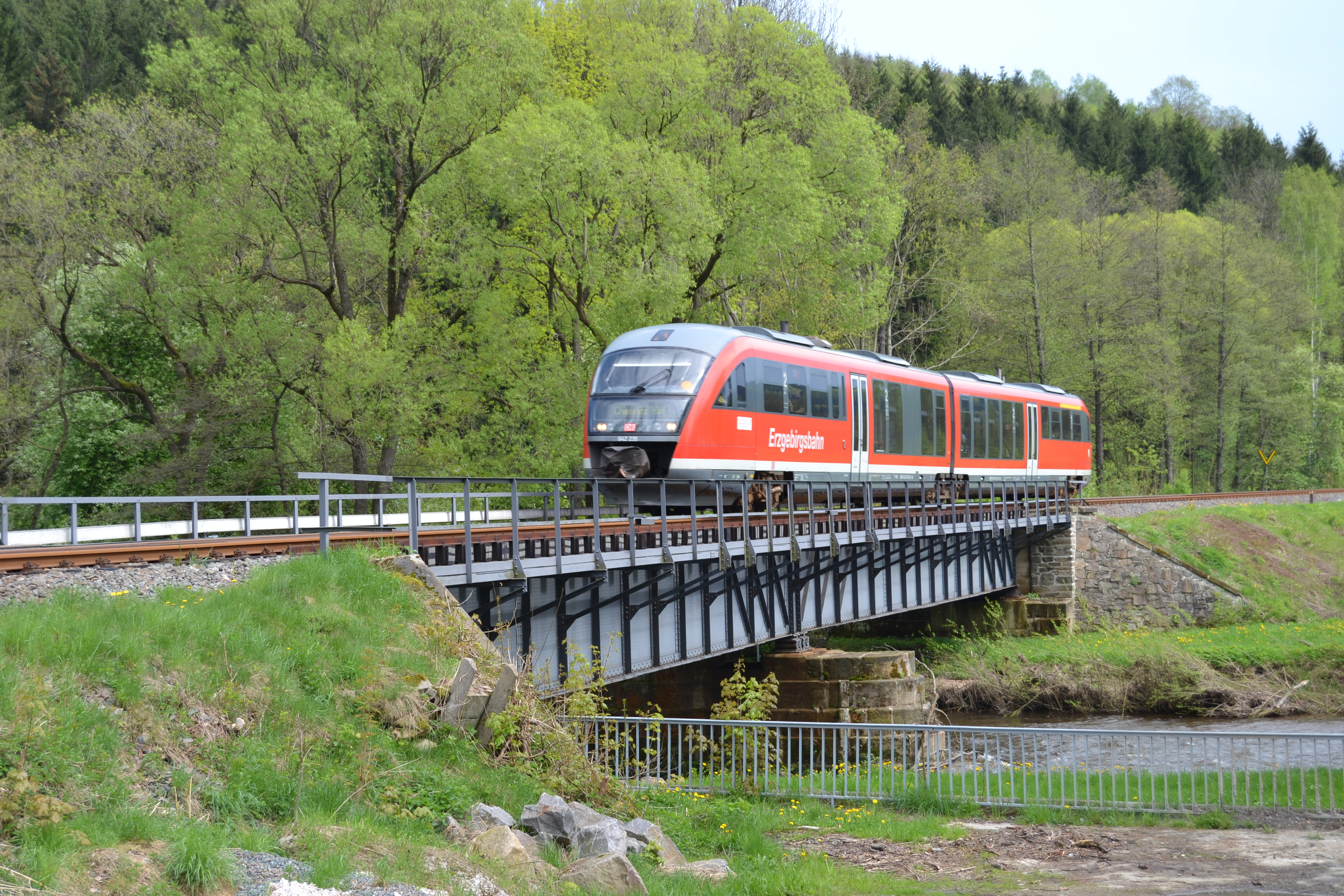
Train of the Erzgebirgsbahn on the Flöha bridge at km 0.685 (2013)

The reconstruction of the Pockau-Lengefeld–Olbernhau section began from 2002. Continuous train operations between Chemnitz Hbf and Olbernhau were resumed on 29 January 2005. The section between Olbernhau and Olbernhau-Grünthal was restored to traffic on 29 October 2005. Since 10 December 2006, a regular hourly service has been operated between Chemnitz and Olbernhau on working days, with trains crossing in Pockau-Lengefeld at the usual symmetry minute, which since December 2011 has been maintained only during peak hours. The route between Olbernhau-Grünthal and Neuhausen was not restored at the time, since no local rail transport has been budgeted by the regional transport association Verkehrsverbund Mittelachsen (Middle Saxony Transport Association, ZVMS). In September 2007, road management measures were implemented. In 2010, the Olbernhau-Grünthal–Neuhausen section, which had been closed since 2001, was restored to working order. Currently only occasional excursion trains run on that section. For the first time in more than nine years a special service of the Erzgebirgsbahn ran to Neuhausen on 13 November 2010.

Due to the low population density in the catchment area of the section of line, ZVMS is not expected to commission passenger services to Neuhausen. Currently, the capacity reduction approved by the Federal Railway Office (Eisenbahn-Bundesamt)—a reduction of the target speed from the current maximum of 40 to 10 or 20 km/h—is planned to be implemented at the timetable change of June 2014. From 6 February to 6 May 2014, DB RegioNetz Infrastruktur GmbH, the current owner of the infrastructure, sought expressions of interest from companies willing to take over the Olbernhau-Grünthal-Neuhausen section as a railway infrastructure company in order to continue to operate public transport at their own risk.

== Route description ==
=== Course ===
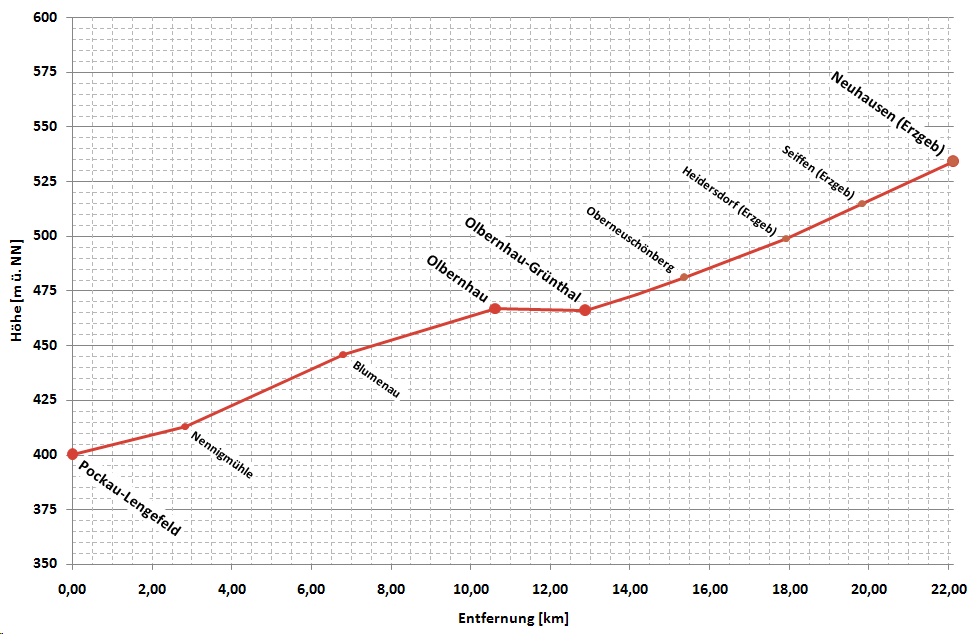
Simplified height profile of the route

The Pockau-Lengefeld–Neuhausen railway leaves Pockau-Lengefeld station to the east. The route runs along the Flöha, which is crossed several times over the course of the line. Between Blumenau and Olbernhau-Grünthal, the section of the line on the southern bank is highly flood-protected.

=== Operating points ===
Pockau-Lengefeld (50°42′26″N 13°13′36″E)

Pockau-Lengefeld station opened on 15 February 1875 as a junction station on the Reitzenhain-Flöha railway. It is located in the fields of Pockau, the suffix of "Lengefeld" was given because of the danger of confusion with Bockau station, which is also located in the Ore Mountains. The formerly extensive facilities of the station were rebuilt around 2005 except for some unconnected tracks.

Nennigmühle (50°41′28″N 13°15′11″E)

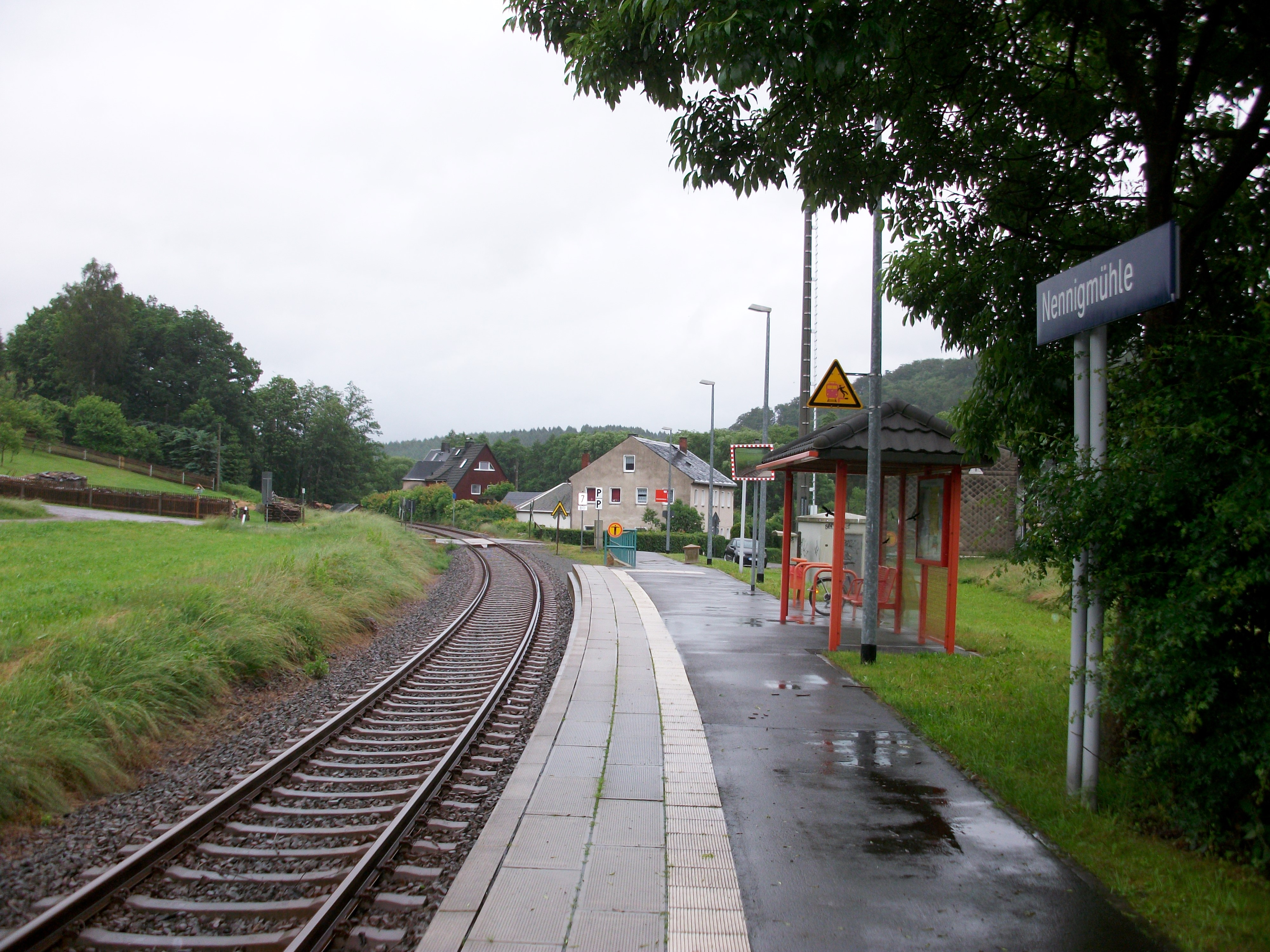
Nennigmühle station (2016)

Nennigmühle halt (Haltepunkt, meaning a station without any points) was opened on 1 September 1877. In addition to the small, wooden entrance building, the station has had an open access since 1912. Until about 1945, the innkeeper of the nearby hotel handled ticket sales and general freight as an agent.

Until 2004, the platform consisted of two parts that were separated by a road. The southern part was fundamentally renovated in the summer of 2004 and the northern part was demolished. The entrance building of 1877 was demolished in 2005 and replaced by a simple passenger shelter.

Blumenau (50°40′16″N 13°17′28″E)

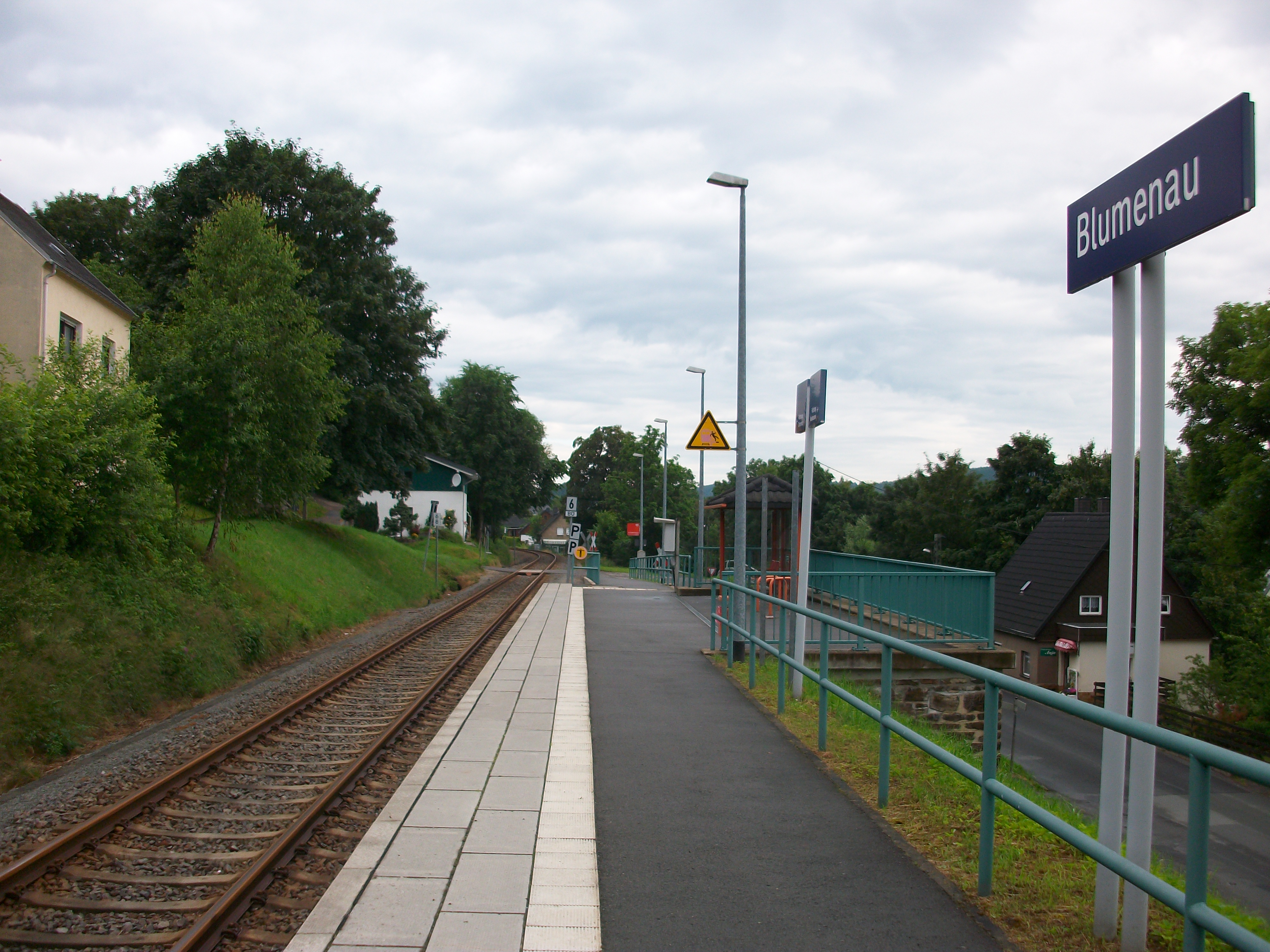
Blumenau station (2016)

Blumenau halt has existed since the opening of the line. It was originally located at 5.590 km, but since 1877 has been at the current location. Since 1893, the buildings have included a waiting room, which in 1897 still had a service room and an open access. In the 1930s, a block post was erected in Blumenau, which was demolished on 23 February 1970.

The waiting room was replaced in 2000 by a simple passenger shelter.

Olbernhau West (50°39′37″N 13°19′16″E)

Olbernhau West halt was opened on 9 December 2007. The platform is accessible via a ramp from the street of Neuer Weg and is 80 metres long.

Olbernhau (50°39′23″N 13°20′12″E)

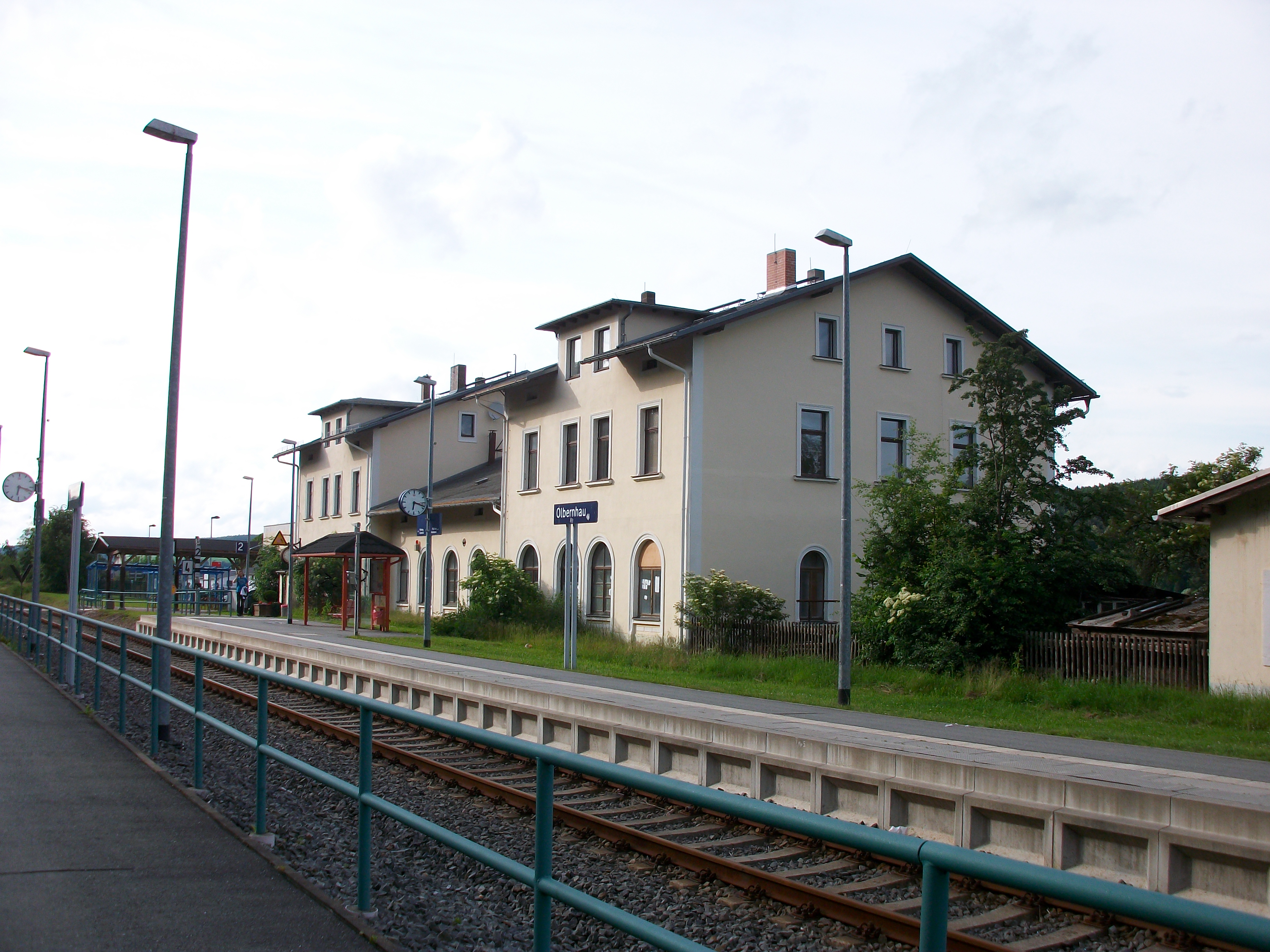
Olbernhau station (2016)

Olbernhau station was established in 1875 as the terminus of the line. At this time, the station had two mainline tracks and five sidings with 13 sets of points. The buildings consisted of an entrance building and a two-storey roundhouse where locomotives were heated (Heizhaus) with a 12-metre turntable.

Over the years, the station was expanded again and again. In the mid-1920s, the track system had grown to include three mainline and eight sidings with 19 single slip and three double slip sets of points. In 1940, there were also four private connecting tracks, which connected in the station area.

A gradual reduction of the installations began immediately after the Second World War, when track 4 was dismantled to provide reparations. However, the most extensive dismantling of the facilities was realised in 2005 as part of the Erzgebirgsbahn's upgrade. Today, the facilities at Olbernhau station consist of two mainline tracks with platforms and a siding. There is no infrastructure for freight transport any more. The long-standing, unused roundhouse of 1875, which was last used by the branch with responsibility for the station locomotive and track maintenance, was demolished in 2007.

Olbernhau-Grünthal (50°38′59″N 13°21′54″E)

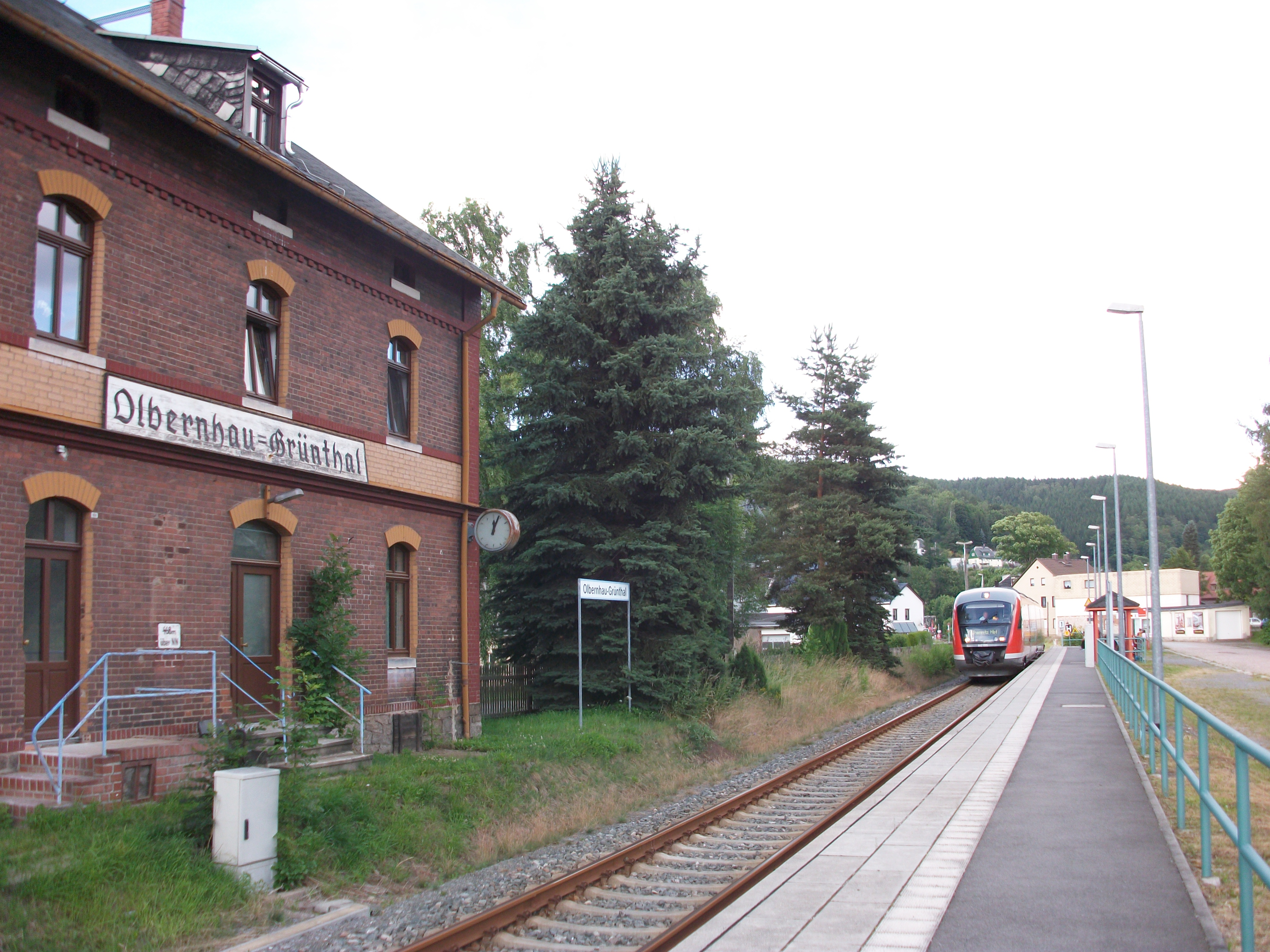
Olbernhau-Grünthal station (2016)

Olbernhau-Grünthal station was opened on 1 October 1895 as Grünthal stop (Haltestelle) and was upgraded to a station in 1905. The station building is made out of clinker bricks, as were several other stations in Saxony at the same time.

At its largest extent since 1914, the station had three mainline tracks and three sidings with 14 single slip sets of points and one double slip set of points. The first reduction of the facilities occurred in 1943, when a track connection with two sets of points was dismantled in favour of military projects. In 2005, the Erzgebirgsbahn built over all the sidings except for the mainline tracks. A new platform was erected in a new location on the side facing away from the entrance building. Olbernhau-Grünthal has been designated as a station since 2007.

Name history:

- until 1900: Grünthal
- until 1928: Kupferhammer-Grünthal
- until 1938: Kupferhammer Grünthal
- since 1938: Olbernhau-Grünthal

From 1927 and 1969, Olbernhau-Grünthal was the starting point of the Schweinitz Valley Railway (Schweinitztalbahn) to Deutschneudorf.

Neuschönberg junction (50°38′52″N 13°22′47″E)

The Schweinitz Valley Railway branched off from the Pockau-Lengefeld–Neuhausen railway to Deutschneudorf at Neuschönberg junction (Abzweig Neuschönberg). The striking, massive signalbox was only occupied when trains operating to and from Deutschneudorf required it. During the rest of the time, the station operated as part of the Olbernhau–Neuhausen route, which meant that the main signals on this route were always "clear." The buildings of the site are still present today and are used by a local gardener.

Oberneuschönberg (50°38′47″N 13°23′42″E)

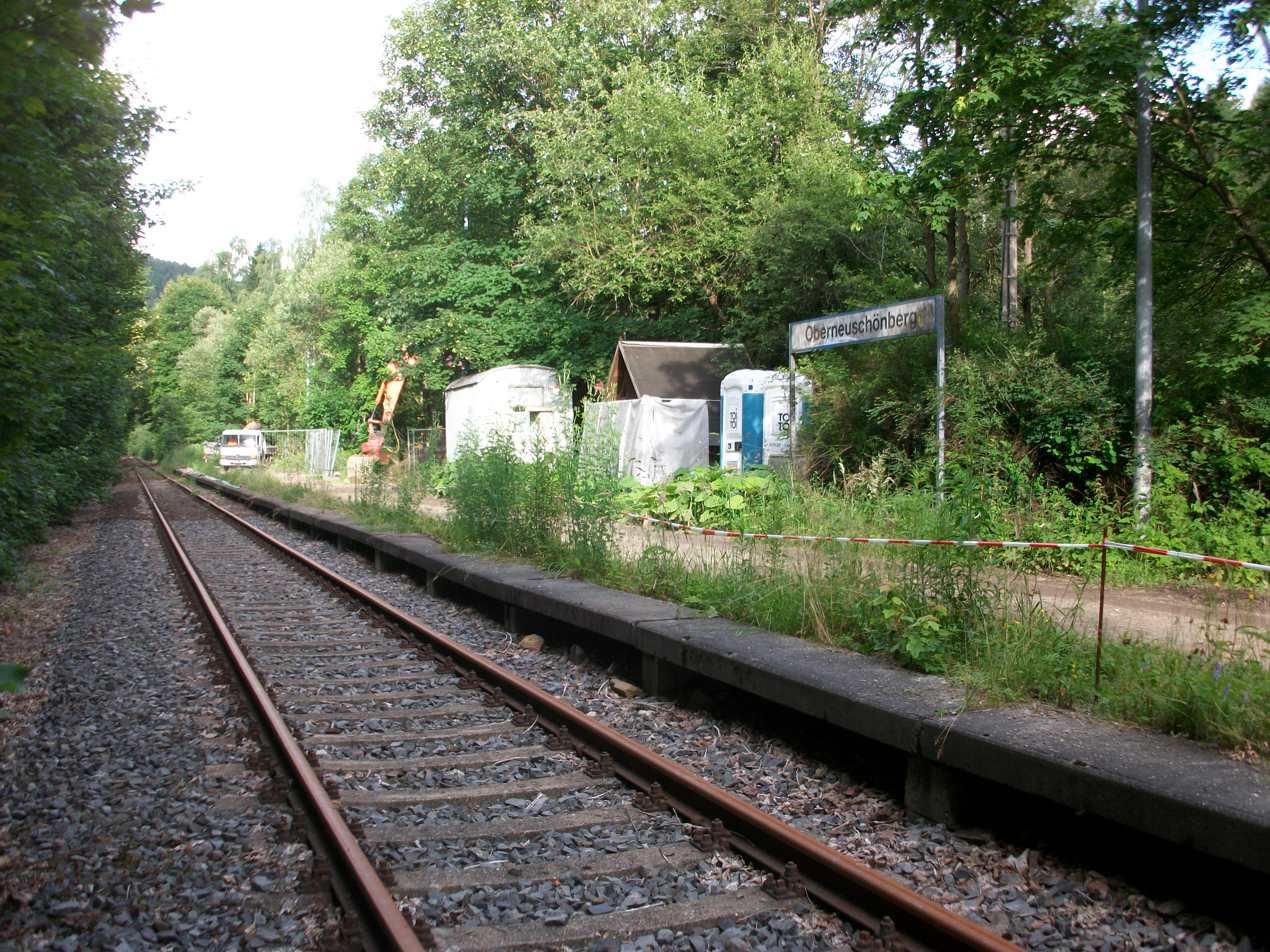
Oberneuschönberg station (2016)

The current Oberneuschönberg halt was originally planned as an access point for the localities of the Schweinitz valley, which were still not served by rail. The station originally had a loading track for the carriage of goods, which had already been partly dismantled in 1940. It was used mainly by the forestry industry for the loading of logs. In March 1966, the remaining set of points and the loading track were removed and the former station was redesignated from a stop (Haltestelle) to a halt (Haltepunkt).

The buildings originally consisted of a waiting room and an open access. The extension for the luggage and waiting room consisted of the skeleton of an old freight building integrated into the building. After the demolition of the buildings in the middle of the 1990s, a small wooden hut was set up as a passenger shelter.

Name history:

- until 1903: Schweinitzthal
- until 1939: Schweinitztal
- since 1939: Oberneuschönberg

Since the closure of the section between Olbernhau-Grünthal and Neuhausen in 2001, the station has been without regular passenger services.

Heidersdorf (Erzgeb) (50°39′41″N 13°25′02″E)

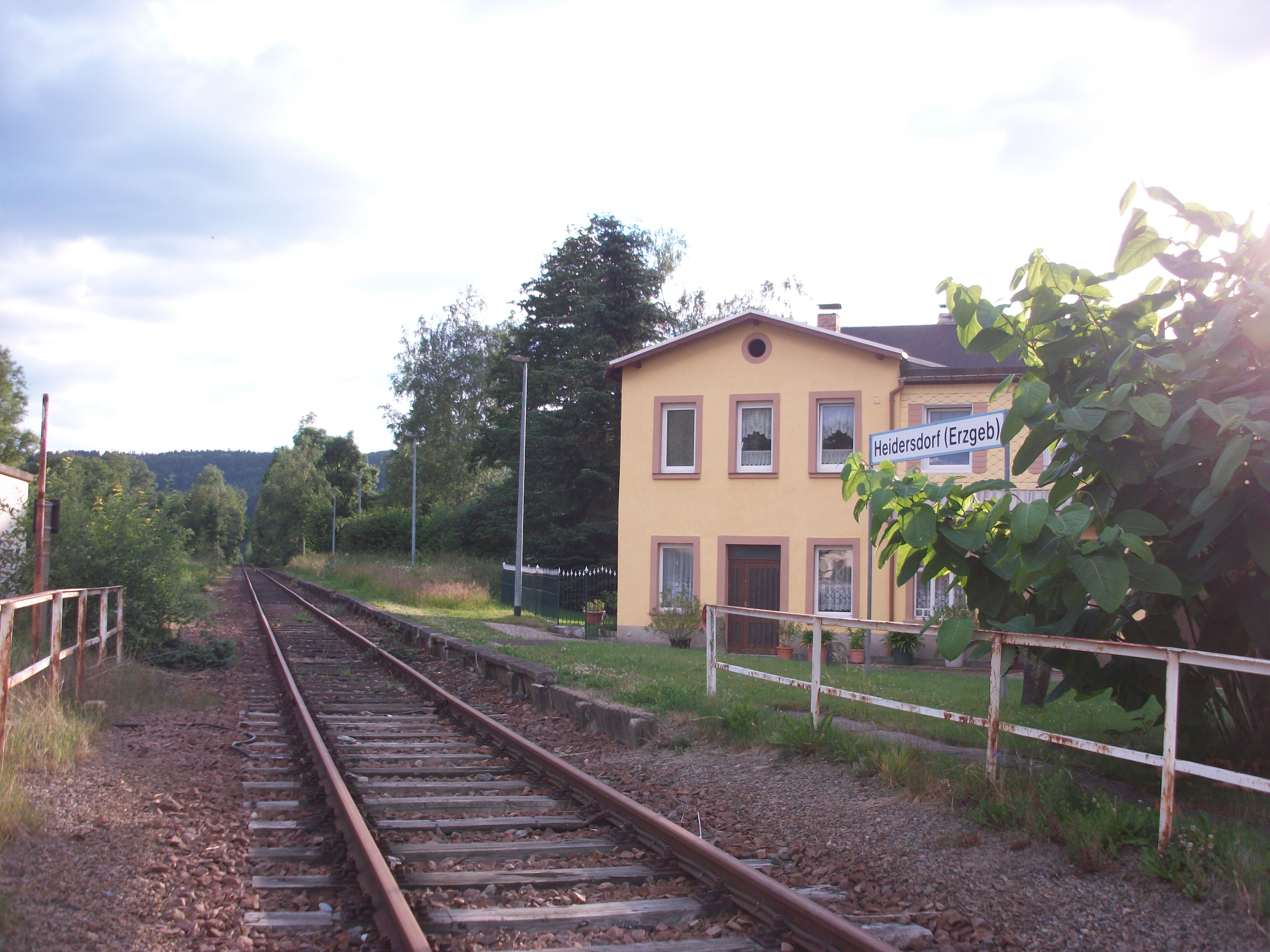
Heidersdorf station (2016)

Heidersdorf (Erzgeb) halt was opened on 1 October 1895 as Niederseiffenbach stop (Haltestelle). Like Oberneuschönberg, the station had a loading track that was connected at both ends. The connecting track of the Gebr. Einhorn woodworking company has also branched off the line since 1912. The buildings originally consisted of the entrance building with a service and waiting room, a freight shed and a free access. The station received the present name of Heidersdorf (Erzgeb) on 15 May 1939.

Between 1963 and 1966, Deutsche Reichsbahn removed the loading track. The connecting line was served until 1990. It was finally abandoned with the termination of the subscriber contract on 31 December 1993. Since then, Heidersdorf (Erzgeb) has only been a halt.

Since the closure of passenger services section between Olbernhau-Grünthal and Neuhausen in 2001, the station has been without regular passenger services. The unused waiting room was demolished in 2005 and not replaced.

Seiffen (Erzgeb) (50°39′55″N 13°26′26″E)

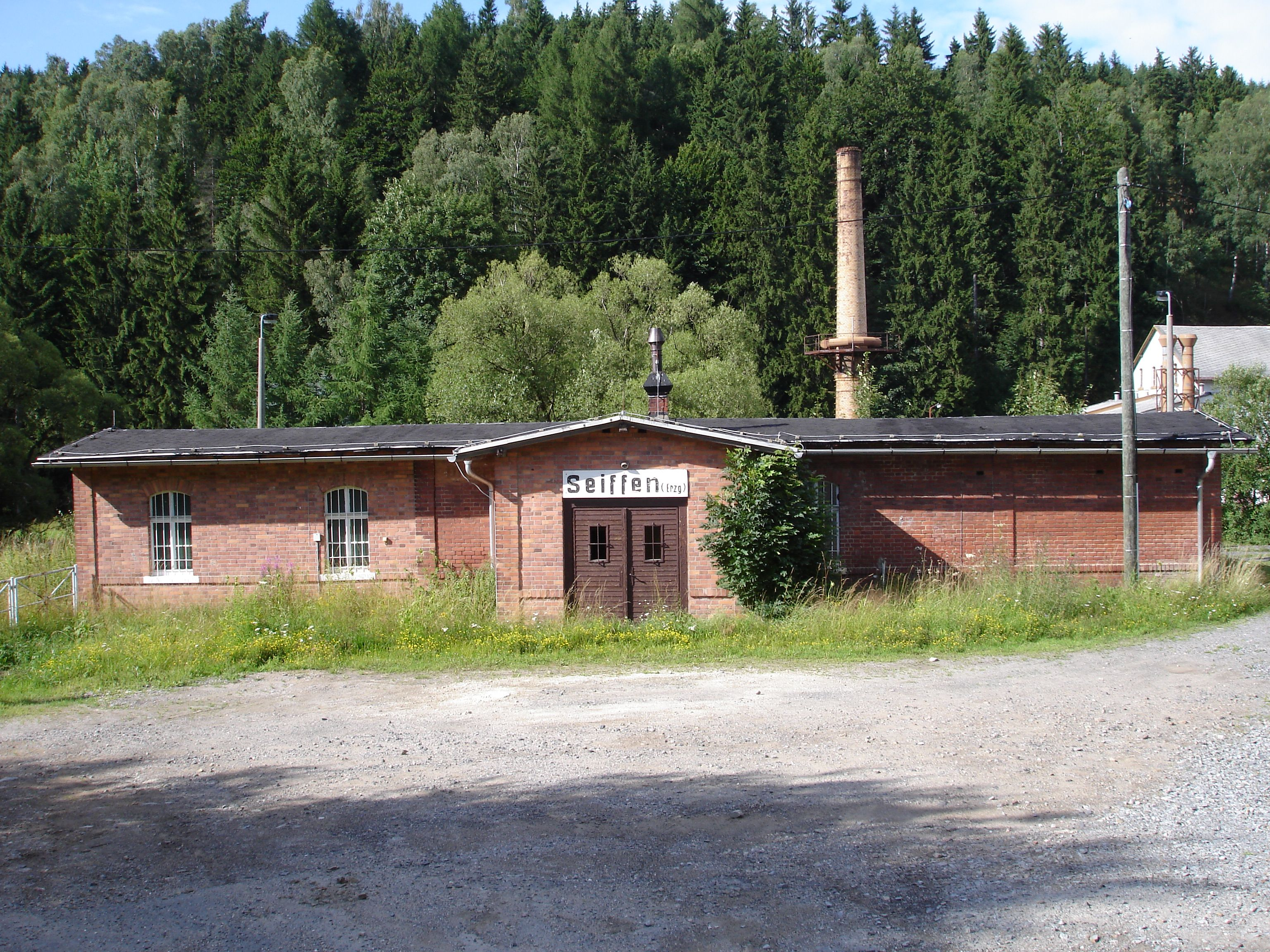
Seiffen station (2008)

Seiffen (Erzgeb) halt was opened on 1 October 1895 in Dittersbacher Flur as Seiffen-Dittersbach stop (Haltestelle), but since 1951 it has had the current name after the nearby locality of Seiffen, which is known in the region as Kurort Seiffen/Erzgeb (Kurort means spa town). In Seiffen, too, there was originally a loading track connected at both ends, which was mainly used by the forestry industry. In contrast to the other intermediate stations, the station has a massive, now unused entrance building.

Since the section between Olbernhau-Grünthal and Neuhausen was closed in 2001, the station has been without regular passenger services.

Neuhausen (Erzgeb) (50°40′29″N 13°27′55″E)

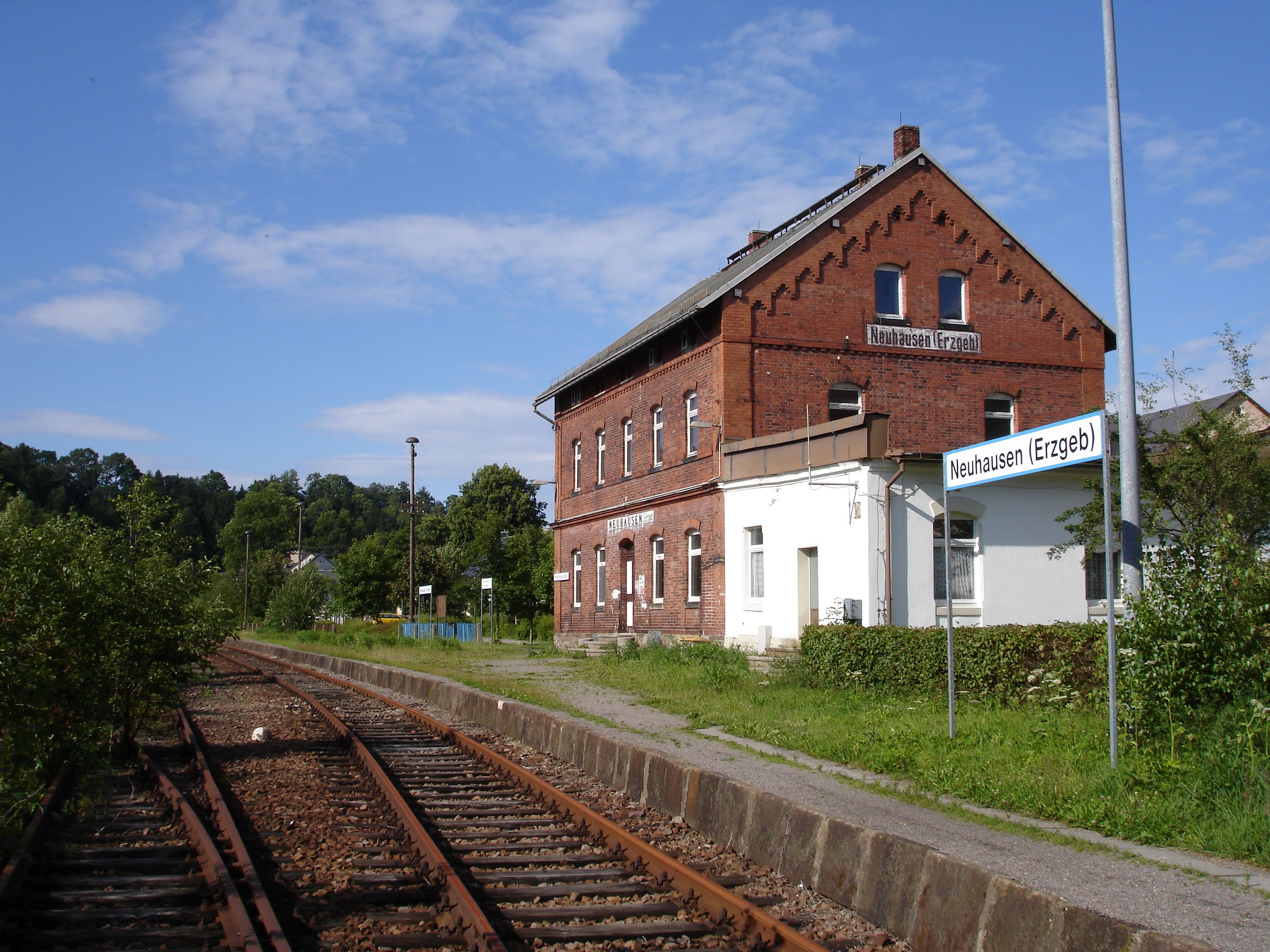
Neuhausen (Erzgeb) station (2008)

Neuhausen (Erzgeb) station is the terminus of the line and had two mainline tracks and five sidings at its opening on 1 October 1895. The clinker entrance building is of a standard design, as it was also used in other Saxon railways. In 1898 the station reached its greatest extent, which now comprised eight tracks with eleven single slip and two double sets of points. In addition to the entrance building, the buildings also included a freight shed and a two-storey roundhouse.

The line from the Carl Helbig chair and furniture factory connected in the station area; this supposedly existed from the construction of the line. The company was absorbed into the East German government company of VEB Vereinigte Sitzmöbelindustrie Neuhausen. The subscriber contract was terminated on 31 December 1993 and the tracks were demolished in 1994. More important was the connecting line for the construction site of the Rauschenbach Dam, which existed between 1961 and 1965. To this end, main track 1 had been extended over the Flöha, where a two-track unloading yard was built for building materials.

With the cessation of the total traffic on the 750 mm gauge Mulda–Sayda railway in 1966, a large part of the wagonload traffic there was transferred to Neuhausen station.

Name history:

- until 1911: Neuhausen i Sachsen
- until 1933: Neuhausen (Sa)
- until 1938: Neuhausen (Sachs)
- since 1938: Neuhausen (Erzgeb)

Since the section between Olbernhau-Grünthal and Neuhausen was closed in 2001, the station has been without regular traffic.

== Rolling stock ==
The Chemnitz-Komotauer Eisenbahn procured two tank locomotives for this branch line and numbered them 9 and 14. They were later classified by the Saxon State Railways as class VII T.

At the end of the 1980s, passenger trains were mostly formed from four-axle Rekowagen (rebuilt carriages) of the Halberstadt RAW design and diesel locomotives of DR class 110. At the end of the 1990s, DB class 772 was used for a short time, followed by push-pull sets consisting of modernised Halberstadt passenger cars and DB class 219 locomotives.

The Erzgebirgsbahn originally operated DB Class 628 diesel multiple units. Today, only Siemens Desiro Classic (class 642) sets are used.
