= Deutschneudorf =

- Municipality
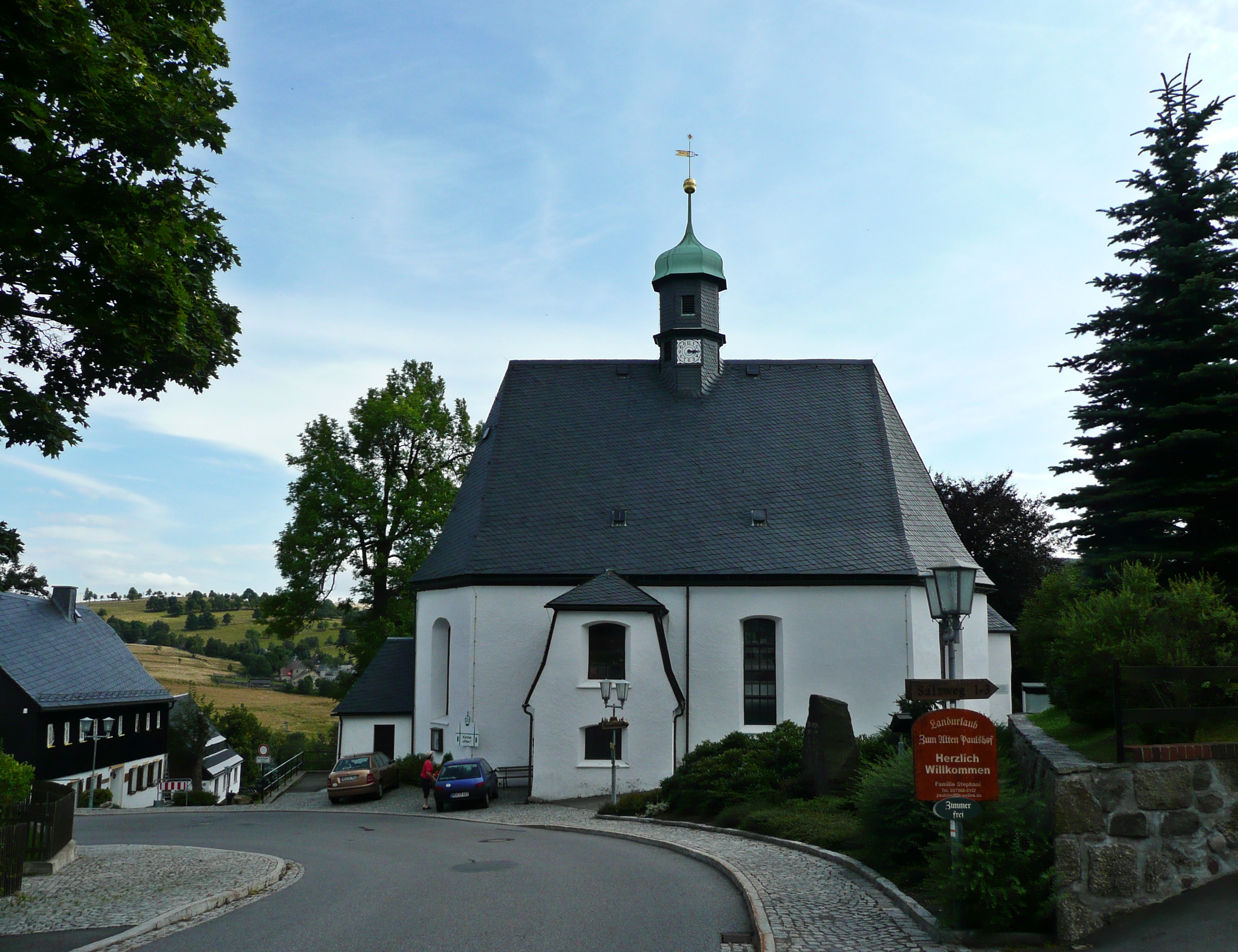
- Church in Deutschneudorf

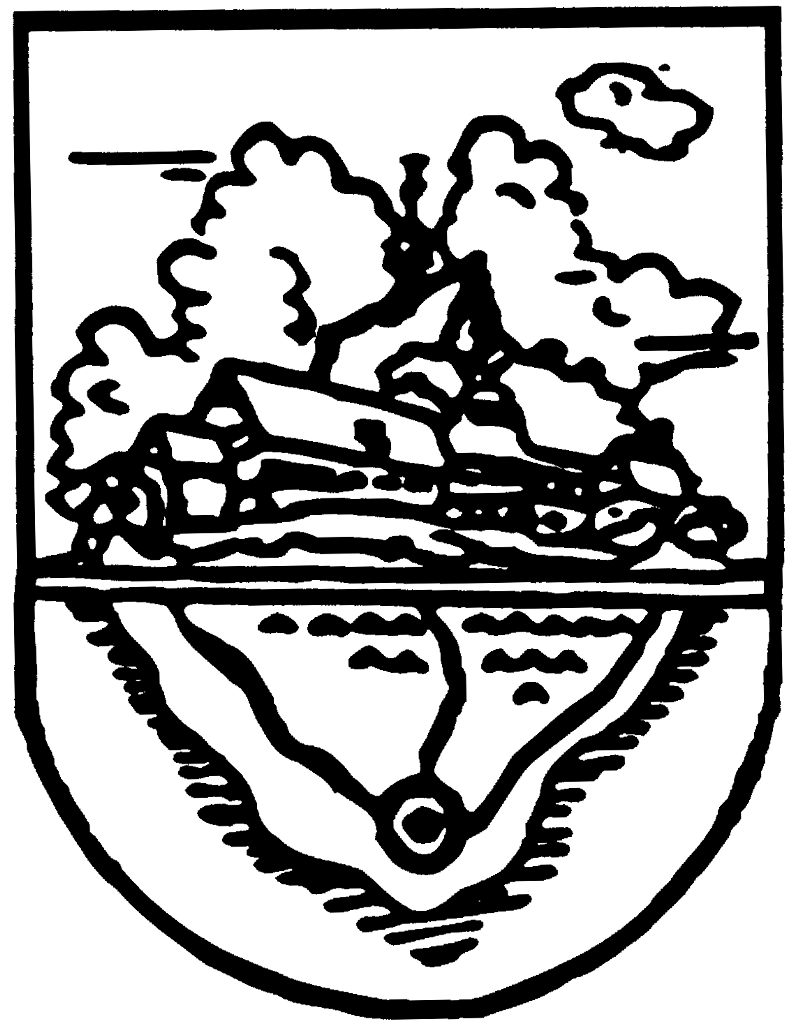
- Coat of arms

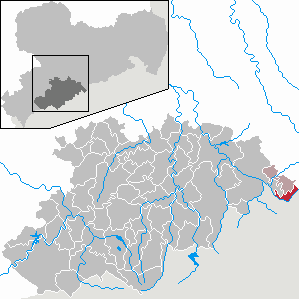
- Location of Deutschneudorf within Erzgebirgskreis district
- Interactive map of Deutschneudorf
- Location within Germany Location within Saxony
- Coordinates: 50°36′11″N 13°27′46″E
- Country: Germany
- State: Saxony
- District: Erzgebirgskreis

Government
  - Mayor (2022–29): René Hoffmann

Area
  - Total: 8.07 km^{2} (3.12 sq mi)
- Elevation: 664 m (2,178 ft)

Population (2025-12-31)
  - Total: 814
  - Density: 101/km^{2} (261/sq mi)
- Time zone: UTC+01:00 (CET)
  - Summer (DST): UTC+02:00 (CEST)
- Postal codes: 09548
- Dialling codes: 037368
- Vehicle registration: ERZ, ANA, ASZ, AU, MAB, MEK, STL, SZB, ZP
- Website: www.deutschneudorf.de

Deutschneudorf (German pronunciation: [ˈdɔʏtʃnɔʏˌdɔʁf]) is a municipality in the district Erzgebirgskreis, in Saxony, Germany.

== Geography ==
Deutschneudorf is situated next to the border to the Czech Republic in the valley of the Schweinitz river, downstream from Nová Ves v Horách. It is a dispersed settlement typical for the upper regions of the Ore Mountains.

The villages of Deutschkatharinenberg and Oberlochmühle, located downstream on the Schweinitz, Brüderwiese, located upstream on the Schweinitz tributary Mühlgraben, and Deutscheinsiedel, northeast of the latter, have been incorporated administratively. The municipality is traversed by state road S214, which meets in Deutscheinsiedel with Saxon state roads S207 from Sayda and S213 from Seiffen, and with Czech state road 271 from Litvínov.

== History ==
First mining activities in the area of the later municipality are reported from about 1514. August Rohdt, owner of smelting works in Grünthal was awarded the mines Fortuna and Pallas in 1620, and had an iron furnace built in 1637 to supply the wire drawing mill in Rothenthal. The settlement in an area that was nearly depopulated after the Thirty Years' War and a plague outbreak is first mentioned in a document of 1651 as Naudorff unterm Catherbergk (referring to the dialectal name of nearby St. Katharinaberg) and had only three houses in 1657. Protestant refugees from St. Katharinaberg settled on clearings and were welcomed as skilled workers.

A teacher is first reported in 1718, the church is completed in 1736 and the schoolhouse in 1741. In 1802 Deutschneudorf becomes an independent church parish. The voluntary fire department is established in 1875, the municipal offices are built in 1924, and an open-air swimming pool in 1936. In 1927 the Olbernhau-Grünthal–Deutschneudorf railway is opened. Oberlochmühle is incorporated into Deutschneudorf on 1 April 1939. In 1944/1945 Wehrmacht units establish a depot for stolen art. A forced march of German-speaking people expelled from Chomutov on 9 June 1945 which caused many deaths led through Deutschneudorf and is commemorated in a monument.

Passenger traffic on the railway from Olbernhau ceased in 1966, the line was closed to freight in 1969 and dismantled in 1971. A central drinking water supply is built from 1966 to 1970.

The municipality of Deutscheinsiedel (with Brüderwiese) joins Deutschneudorf on 1 January 1999. Deutschneudorf was one of the first places to suffer inundations during the 2002 European floods.

The municipality was known as the site of a dig for Gold stolen by Nazi Germany in World War II. Radar scans of an abandoned copper mine suggested the presence of a large amount of dense metal believed to be too dense to be copper. On 28 February 2008, it was reported by CNN and other media outlets that digging had halted due to a disagreement between the two leaders of the dig. It has been speculated that the contents of the Amber Room may also be found in this mine.
