= Hora Svaté Kateřiny =

- Town
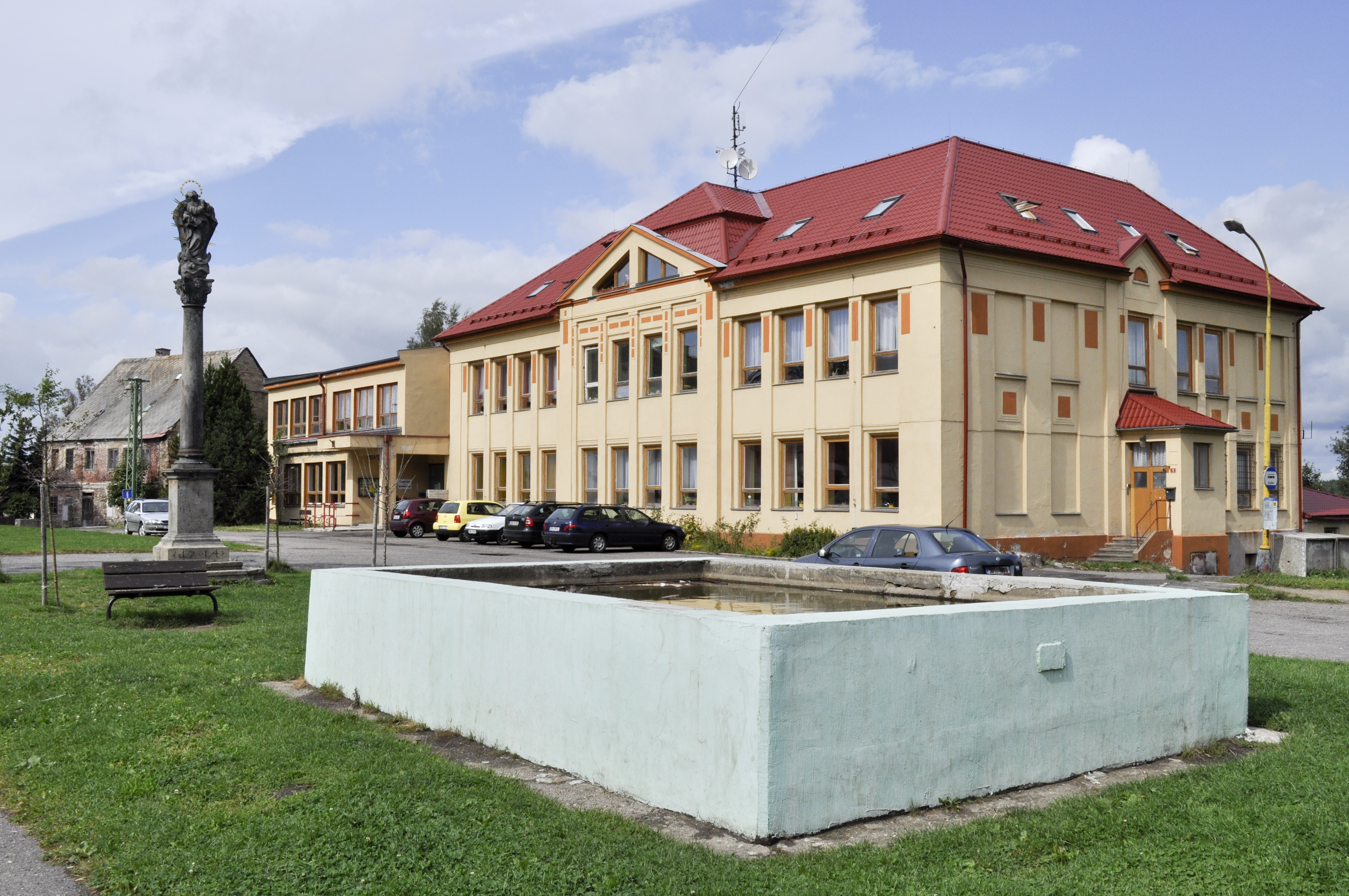
- The square Náměstí Pionýrů with a school and Marian column

- Flag Coat of arms

- Location in the Czech Republic
- Coordinates: 50°36′23″N 13°26′13″E
- Country: Czech Republic
- Region: Ústí nad Labem
- District: Most
- First mentioned: 1480

Government
  - Mayor: Lukáš Pakosta

Area
  - Total: 18.46 km^{2} (7.13 sq mi)
- Elevation: 645 m (2,116 ft)

Population (2026-01-01)
  - Total: 476
  - Density: 25.8/km^{2} (66.8/sq mi)
- Time zone: UTC+1 (CET)
  - Summer (DST): UTC+2 (CEST)
- Postal code: 435 46
- Website: www.horasvatekateriny.cz

Hora Svaté Kateřiny (Czech pronunciation: [ˈɦora ˈsvatɛː ˈkatɛr̝ɪnɪ]; German: Sankt Katharinaberg) is a town in Most District in the Ústí nad Labem Region of the Czech Republic. It has about 500 inhabitants. The town is located in the Ore Mountains on the border with Germany.

Hora Svaté Kateřiny was founded as a mining settlement in the 15th century and became a royal mining town in 1528. Silver and copper were mined here.

== Administrative division ==
Hora Svaté Kateřiny consists of three municipal parts (in brackets population according to the 2021 census):

- Hora Svaté Kateřiny (433)
- Malý Háj (9)
- Rudolice v Horách (14)

== Etymology ==
The settlement was originally named Hallberg, which originated from the name Kupferhall for an old mine. According to a legend, a maid came across silver while mowing the grass, and the town was named after the patron saint of the miners, Saint Catherine of Alexandria. A historically more likely explanation is that the settlement was renamed Katharinaberg after the sister of the ore discoverer Hans Georg, who had previously named after himself and his sisters Johanngeorgenstadt, Marienberg, and Annaberg. The name Hora Svaté Kateřiny literally means "Saint Catherine's Mountain".

== Geography ==
Hora Svaté Kateřiny is located about 17 kilometres (11 mi) northwest of Most and 41 km (25 mi) west of Ústí nad Labem. It lies on the Czech–German border and is adjacent to the municipality of Deutschneudorf in Saxony.

Hora Svaté Kateřiny lies in the Ore Mountains. The highest peaks in the municipal territory are Eduardova skála at 902 m (2,959 ft) above sea level on the border with Boleboř, and Kamenný vrch at 842 m (2,762 ft) near the border with Brandov. A dominant feature of the town proper is the hill Růžový vrch at 729 m (2,392 ft).

The stream Kateřinský potok, a left tributary of the Schweinitz, flows through the municipal territory. The southern boundary of the territory follows approximately the stream Telčský potok, a right tributary of the Natzschung.

== History ==
The first written mention of the settlement is from 1480, when Lorenz Glatz of Altenhorst acquired the mines in 1473 and opened new ones as well as a smeltery. In 1516, his sister Anna, the wife of military leader and mining entrepreneur Sebastian von Weitmühl, inherited the property. Silver was struck in the 16th century, leading to a significant boom of the community which in 1528 was elevated to the status of a royal mining town. Towards the end of the 16th century, the town passed into the hands of Emperor Rudolf II. It had about 177 houses and up to 2,500 inhabitants at this time.

Upon changing hands in 1605, the smelting works were closed and the copper ore was brought to Grünthal near Olbernhay in Saxony for processing. The new owners had little interest in continuing the mines, and overruled the privileges hitherto conceded to the mining towns and the miners. The inhabitants were burdened with socage despite the interventions of emperors Rudolf II and Ferdinand II. Instead of mining, the weaving of linen was taken up on a large scale. The evangelical church, which was begun in 1607 and consecrated in 1611, passed in the course of Counter-Reformation, upon compulsory conversion of the populace to Catholicism in 1627, to the patronage of the Jesuits of Dux in 1632.

During the Thirty Years' War, the town suffered from troops passing through or taking quarters there, who also carried away food and property, from famine and epidemies, and from robber gangs. Further epidemies in 1680 and emigration reduced the population by 55 families, and only 70 houses were still inhabited, while 65 lay in ruins. In the early 18th century, knitting supplemented the linen industry, and inhabitants of St. Katharinaberg also supplied the cloth manufacturers in Oberleutensdorf. Mining flourished again until the late 1760s but ceased completely in 1786. During the Seven Years' War, the town was raided 14 times by Prussian troops, with financial damages amounting to 21,736 florins.

Agriculture had never been practiced in the town to any large extent, and animal husbandry and forestry provided little income. Thus, many families went to work in nearby Brandov or across the border in Saxony. In 1850, the town had become the seat of a judicial district, a notary's office, a post and telegraph office, a police station, and a customs office. In the 19th century, wood working was taken up on an industrial scale and prospered, so that in 1874 a vocational school for this sector was established in St. Katharinaberg, but moved to Oberleutensdorf five years later. A fire in 1904 destroyed 44 homes.

In 1933, the town had 1,544 inhabitants, 65% of which were industry workers, 17% worked in commerce, 10% in agriculture, and 8% were public servants. 98% of the population were of German ethnicity. After World War II, the Germans were expelled, causing the municipality to be depopulated and to lose its town privileges. These were only restored on 2 April 2008.

Plans to expand the nearby lignite surface mine threatened the continuity of road communications in the area, which led the mayor, Lukáš Pakosta, in 2015 to publicly consider joining the town to Germany. This caused a political controversy.

== Demographics ==
Historical population

Year	Pop.	±%
1869	2,200	—
1880	2,096	−4.7%
1890	1,993	−4.9%
1900	2,004	+0.6%
1910	2,147	+7.1%

Year	Pop.	±%
1921	1,910	−11.0%
1930	1,907	−0.2%
1950	382	−80.0%
1961	448	+17.3%
1970	398	−11.2%

Year	Pop.	±%
1980	398	+0.0%
1991	275	−30.9%
2001	330	+20.0%
2011	445	+34.8%
2021	456	+2.5%

Source: Censuses

== Transport ==
There are no railways or major roads passing through the municipality. On a bridge across the Schweinitz River is the road border crossing with Germany Hora Sv. Kateřiny / Deutschkatharinenberg.

== Sights ==
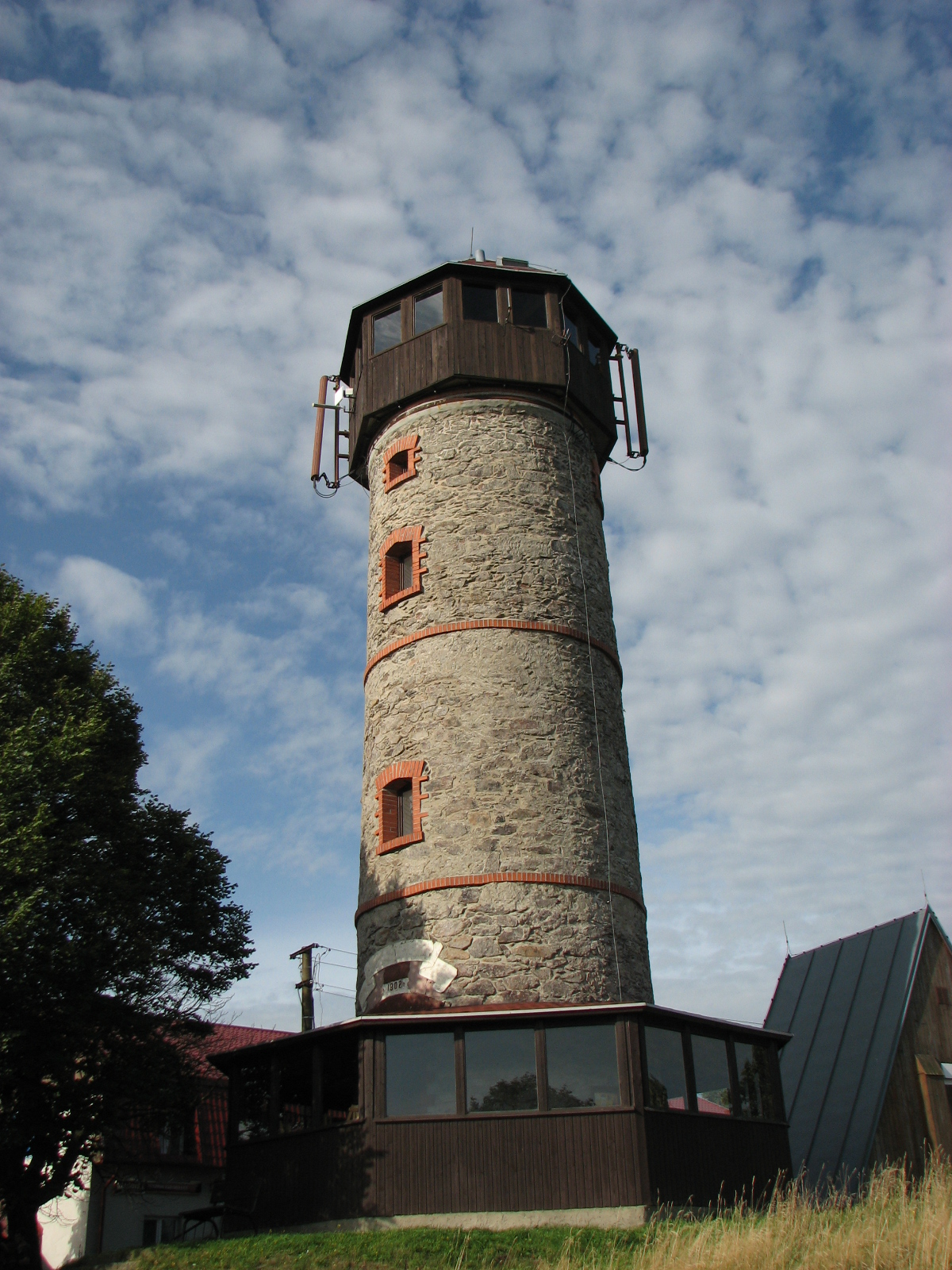
Observation tower on Růžový vrch

On the hill Růžový vrch is an observation tower. The 16 m (52 ft) high tower was built in 1902 and restored in 2002, after it was closed in the 1980s. A wooden extension was built around the base of the tower to serve as exhibition space. Near the observation tower is the Monument to Anton Günther.

The Church of Saint Catherine was built in 1611–1612 and rebuilt in the Baroque style in 1785. The tower also dates from 1785. The sculpture of a Pietà in front of the church dates from 1729. The rectory opposite the church dates from 1680.

There is a Marian column with a statue of the Virgin Mary on the town square.

Mikulášská štola ('Adit of [Saint] Nicholas') is the most famous silver and copper adit in the Ore Mountains. The corridors reach a depth of up to 157 m (515 ft) underground. Today they are flooded, but about 420 m of the adit is reconstructed and open to the public.

== Notable people ==
- Gerhard Grimmer (1943–2023), German cross-country skier
