= Olbernhau =

- Town
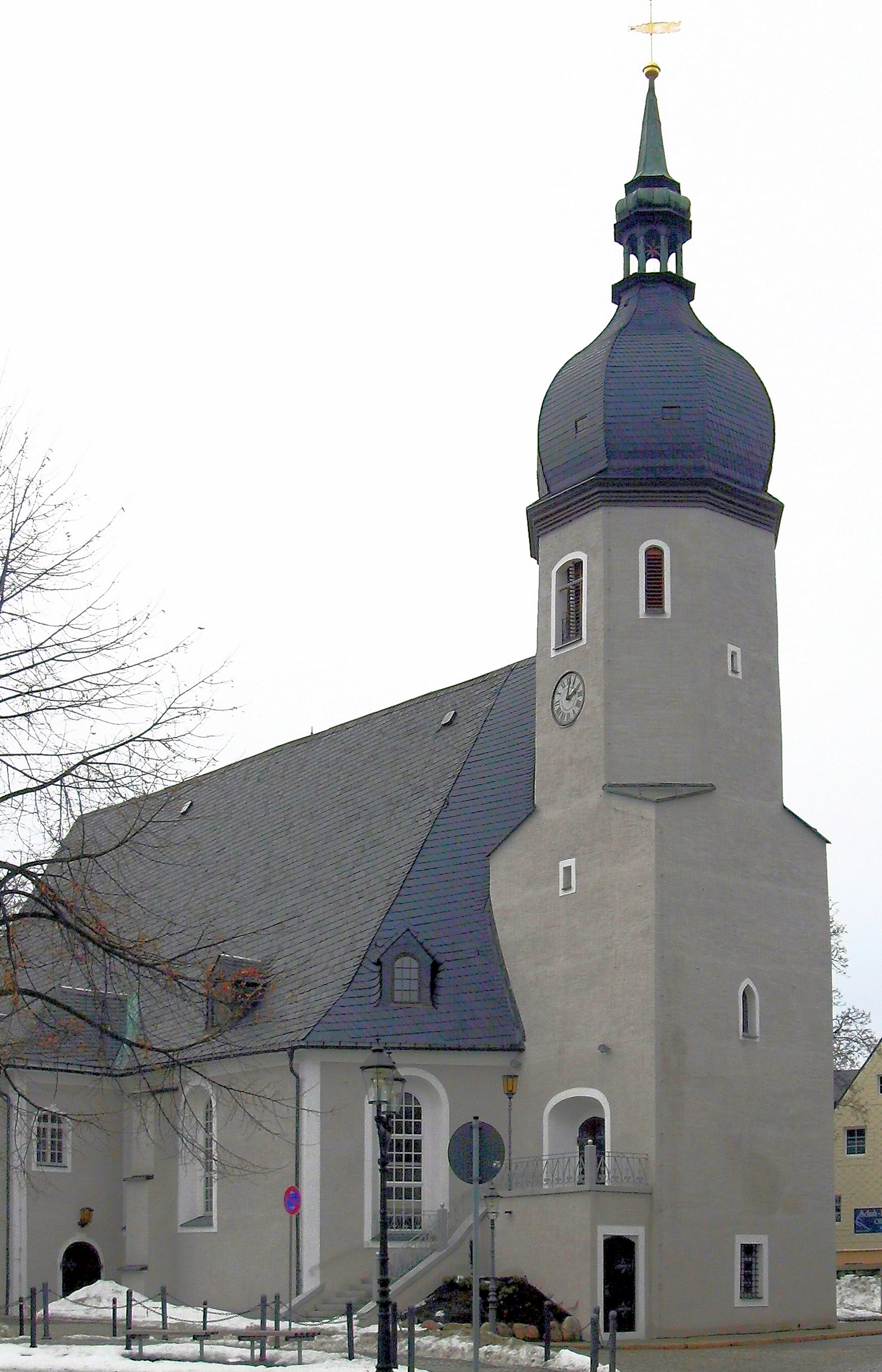

- Coat of arms

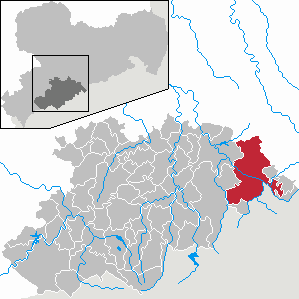
- Location of Olbernhau within Erzgebirgskreis district
- Interactive map of Olbernhau
- Location within Germany Location within Saxony
- Coordinates: 50°40′N 13°20′E
- Country: Germany
- State: Saxony
- District: Erzgebirgskreis

Government
  - Mayor (2022–29): Jörg Klaffenbach (Ind.)

Area
  - Total: 125.36 km^{2} (48.40 sq mi)
- Elevation: 440 m (1,440 ft)

Population (2025-12-31)
  - Total: 9,800
  - Density: 78/km^{2} (200/sq mi)
- Time zone: UTC+01:00 (CET)
  - Summer (DST): UTC+02:00 (CEST)
- Postal codes: 09526
- Dialling codes: 037360
- Vehicle registration: ERZ, ANA, ASZ, AU, MAB, MEK, STL, SZB, ZP
- Website: www.olbernhau.de

Olbernhau (German pronunciation: [ˈɔlbɐnhaʊ]) is a town in the district Erzgebirgskreis, in Saxony, Germany. It is situated in the Ore Mountains, 35 km southeast of Chemnitz, and 23 km north of Chomutov, Czech Republic.

== History ==
Presumably, the town's name arose from the old German name Albert (Albernhaw, Alberthau, Albernhau, Albretshain). Olbernhau has its origins back in the 13th century. Encouraged by Archbishop Albert I. of Meissen, the so-called White Monks (Cistercians) from Osek founded the first settlement in the upper Flöha valley, shortly after ore was found here. Olbernhau was first mentioned in records in 1434 (as "Albernaw") in a contract documenting the sale of Olbernhau to the patritian Caspar von Berbisdorf.

Ore mining started in 1511. In the course of the Protestant reformation Olbernhau became a parish in 1539. A school is mentioned for the first time in 1556. The solidly built church was consecrated in 1590. About 1684 the industrial art of gunsmithing was introduced in Olbernhau. In 1690, Olbernhau's first barrel forge was erected in the Rungstock valley, and in 1708 the gun manufactory delivered 12,000 guns to the Saxonian Army. In 1815, a gunpowder mill was founded, which was partly destroyed by explosions in the years 1835, 1850 and 1865. The last gun left the Olbernhau factory in 1854.

The launch of the Pockau-Lengefeld–Neuhausen railway (also known as the Flöhatalbahn—Flöha Valley Railway) in May 1875 linked Olbernhau to the railway network. A Kindergarten was built in 1878. In the 1880es, Olbernhau gained a hospital, gasworks and gas street lights, and in 1892 Saxony's very first electric power station began operation in Olbernhau. From 1895, steam trains ran on the section of line between Olbernhau and Neuhausen. On 1 January 1902 Olbernhau received town privileges. In 1906, the beautiful art deco Concert and Ball Hall "Tivoli" was inaugurated. A public swimming bath opened in 1930. In 2002, one of the worst Flöha floods in history destroyed parts of the town centre and many houses on the river's banks. Thanks to many private donations from all over Germany, most of the enormous damages (amounting to several million Euros) was repaired within one year.

== Tourism ==
Olbernhau is a popular tourist destination. Among the town's major sights are:

- the Copper Hammer Mill "Althammer" on which the Russian tzar Peter the Great once rode
- the open-air museum "Saigerhütte" (founded in 1493, ore processing technology + tiny workmen's houses)
- the museum, located in a former manor, offering a wide range of information about local traditions
- the "Tanz- und Ballhaus Tivoli", a ballroom with beautiful Art Deco glass window
- the pittoresque Oberneuschönberg church (consecrated in 1695).

Snuggled in the Flöha Valley with its six sub-valleys, Olbernhau offers scenic views and paths for hiking and winter sports.
