= Reitzenhain (Marienberg) =

- Village of Marienberg
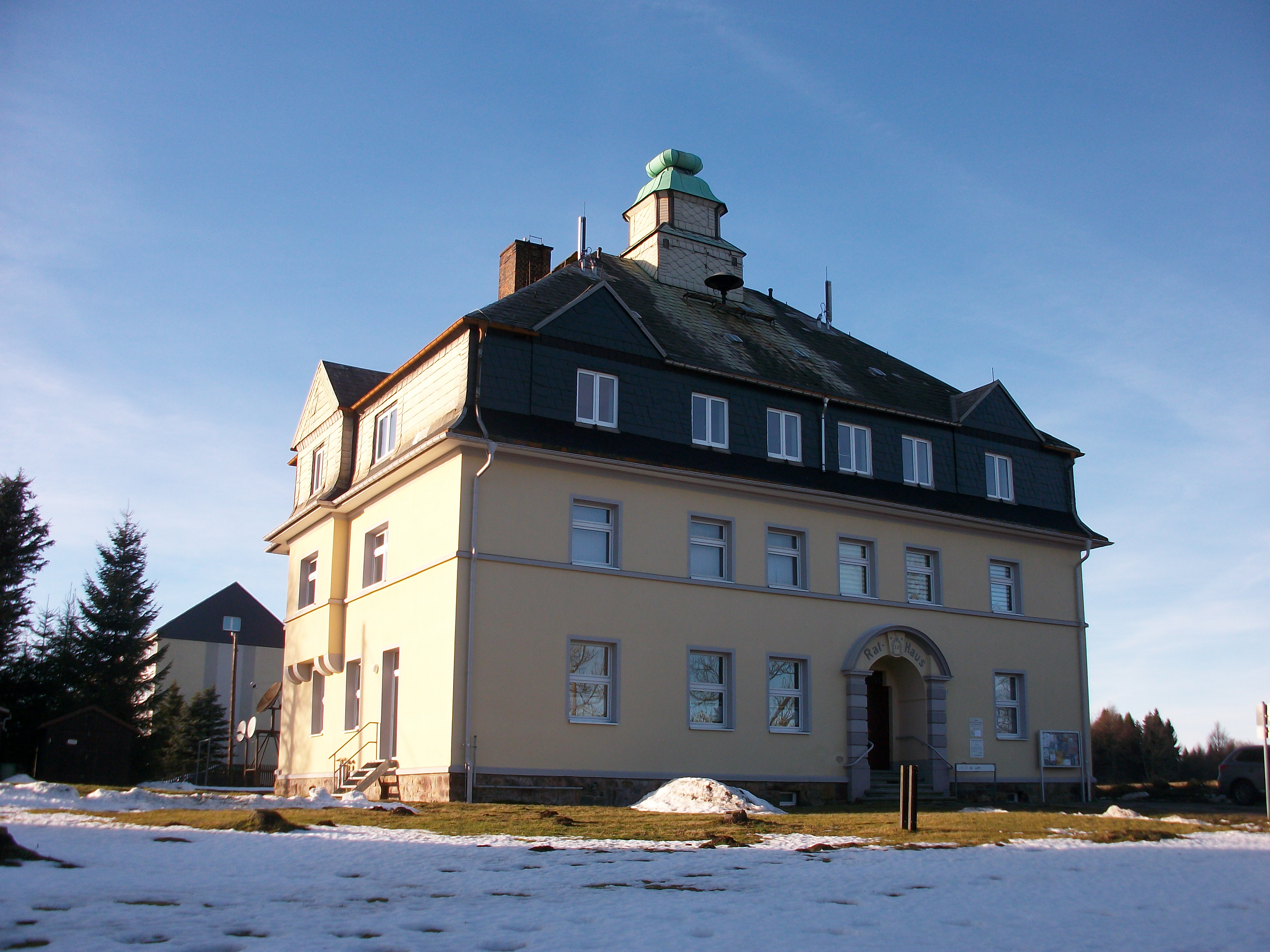
- Town hall

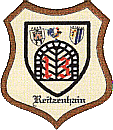
- Coat of arms
- Interactive map of Reitzenhain
- Location within Germany Location within Saxony
- Coordinates: 50°33′40″N 13°13′10″E
- Country: Germany
- State: Saxony
- District: Erzgebirgskreis
- Town: Marienberg
- Elevation: 779 m (2,556 ft)

Population (2021)
  - Total: 279
- Time zone: UTC+01:00 (CET)
  - Summer (DST): UTC+02:00 (CEST)
- Postal codes: 09496
- Dialling codes: 037364
- Vehicle registration: ERZ

Reitzenhain is a village in the Ore Mountains which is now a subdivision of Marienberg in the district Erzgebirgskreis.

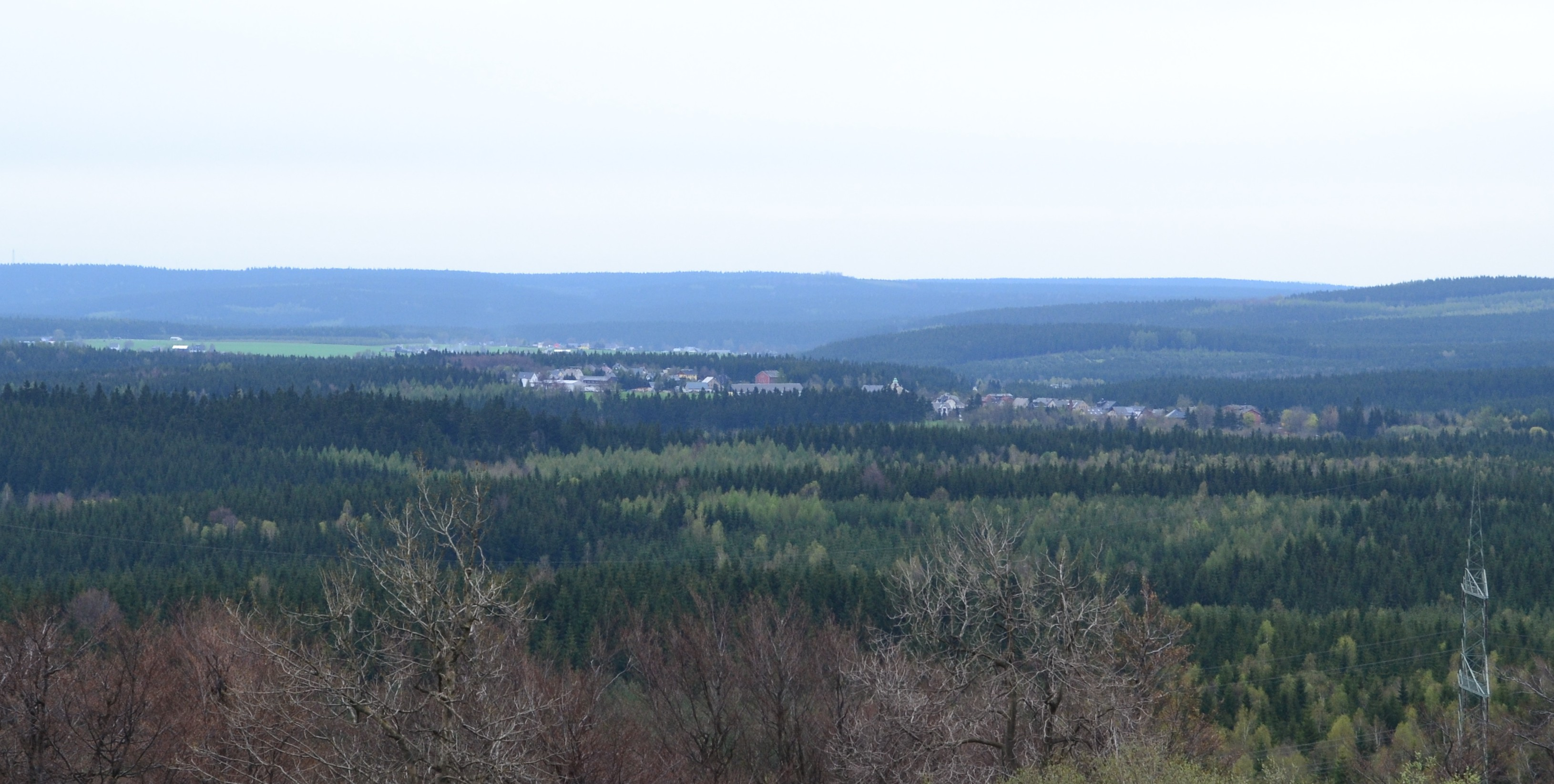
Reitzenhain seen from Hirtstein

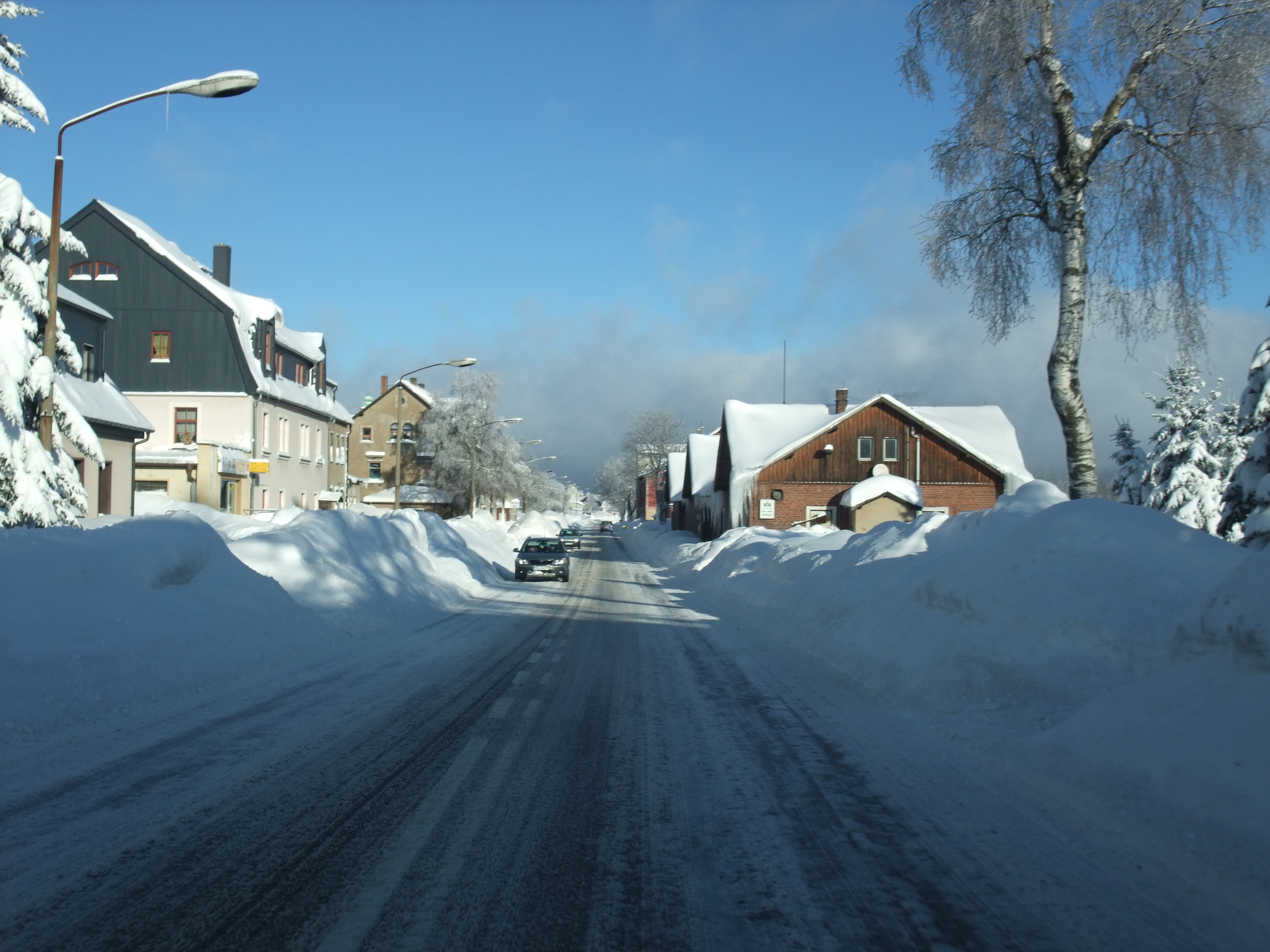
Reitzenhain, former railway station on the right

== Geography ==
Reitzenhain is located on the crest of the Ore Mountains, next to the border between Germany and the Czech Republic at an altitude of ca. 778 m (station building) on the stream Schwarze Pockau. The abandoned village Pohraniční (Böhmisch Reizenhain) is situated to its south-east, on the Czech side of the border and on the right bank of the stream.

== Etymology ==
The name of the village is supposedly derived from a wayside inn (locally called a Han) on the nearby mountain pass, which happened to be the thirteenth inn ('Dreizehnter Han') on the road from Leipzig to Prague, counted from either end. This is also reflected by the number "13" (German: 'Dreizehn') in the village's coat of arms.

== History ==
Reitzenhain was first mentioned in a document of 1401 as Reiczenstein, being a village on the border to Bohemia. In 1551 it belonged to Großrückerswalde parish, in 1607 it was transferred to Kühnhaide parish. Reitzenhain children also attended school in Kühnhaide. Due to the strategically important location on the Reitzenhain pass, the village was frequently occupied by military forces, in particular in the Thirty Years' War and in the Seven Years' War. Until 1856 Reitzenhain belonged administratively to Amt Wolkenstein.

The road between Marienberg and Reitzenhain was improved to rural highway standards in the first half of the 19th century. The railway from Chemnitz to Komotau via Marienberg was opened on 23 August 1875. The volunteer fire department was founded in 1879. A schoolhouse was opened in 1882. Peat digging started in 1891. Together with the neighbouring Reizenhain on the Czech side of the border, the Reitzenhain neighbourhood of Reißigmühle was connected to the electricity supply network in 1921. New municipal offices were inaugurated in 1924.

Kühnhaide was administratively joined with Reitzenhain on 1 October 1937, but became a separate municipality again on 1 April 1948. During World War II, a bomb dropped on the village in February 1945, destroyed one building and killed 14 people. In April 1945, a transport of prisoners from a subcamp of the Buchenwald concentration camp in Tröglitz, stopped in the village, and then the SS and local German civilians carried out a massacre of at least 380 prisoners, who tried to escape. The surviving prisoners were sent on a death march to German-occupied Terezín. After the war, the economical ties to Bohemia were interrupted, which caused a decline of the village.

Reitzenhain remained a separate municipality until 31 December 1993, it then joined with Kühnhaide, Rübenau, and Satzung to form the new municipality Hirtstein of which it became the administrative seat. On 1 January 2003 Hirtstein joined Marienberg.

== Infrastructure ==
Bundesstraße 174 from Chemnitz ends on the border crossing to Hora Svatého Šebestiána and continues from there as National Road 7 to Chomutov.

Reitzenhain station was border station on the Saxon line Flöha-Reitzenhain which continued via Reizenhain (Pohraniční) to Chomutov. When cross-border traffic ceased after World War II, the station lost its importance. Passenger trains to Reitzenhain were cancelled on 1 October 1978, freight trains on 8 January 1994, the line between Marienberg and Reitzenhain was closed on 15 December 1998 and has been lifted in 2013 in favour of a bicycle and hiking path.

Reitzenhain has bus connections with Annaberg-Buchholz, Marienberg and Olbernhau on weekdays, and to Rübenau and Satzung on schooldays, provided by VMS.

== People ==
- Eugen Georg Schuffenhauer, founder of a religious movement who claimed to be able to converse with the spirits of the dead, lived in Reitzenhain from 1922 until his death in 1953.
