= Hirtstein (municipality) =

The municipality of Hirtstein in Saxony, Germany was formed on 1 January 1994 from the hitherto separate municipalities of Rübenau, Reitzenhain, Kühnhaide and Satzung. Its administrative seat was Reitzenhain. The Hirtstein mountain near Satzung lent its name to the new municipality. Beginning on 1 January 2000, Hirtstein formed an administrative cooperation with the neighbouring town Marienberg. The merger with Marienberg was agreed upon on 24 June 2002 and became effective on 1 January 2003 when the constituents of Hirtstein became subdivisions of Marienberg.
