= Lauterstein Castle (Marienberg) =

Lauterstein Castle
- Burg Lauterstein, Burgruine Niederlauterstein
- Niederlauterstein, Marienberg in Germany
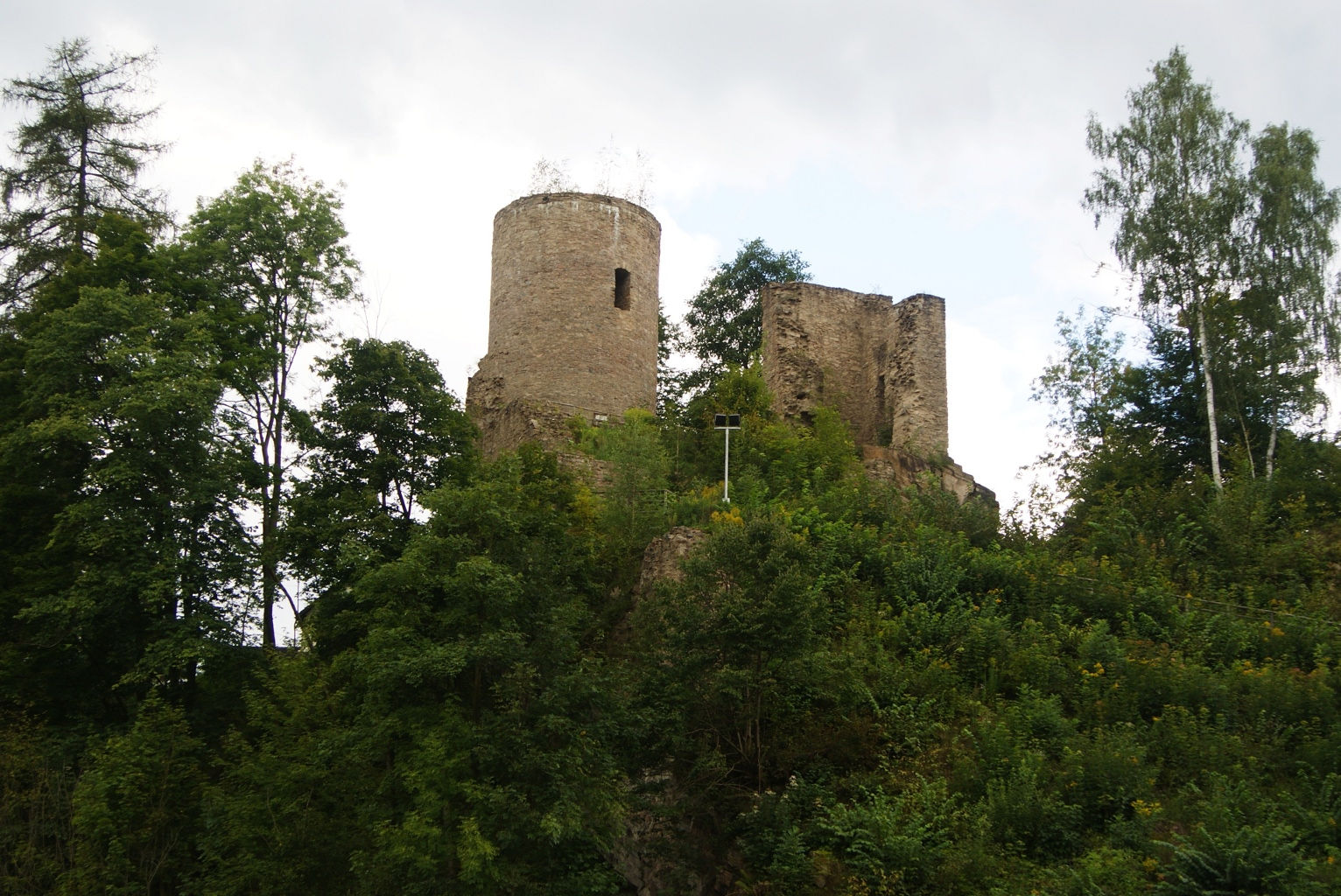
- Lauterstein Castle near Marienberg

Site information
- Type: castle
- Condition: ruin

Location
- Location of Lauterstein Castle in Saxony
- Coordinates: 50°40′7″N 13°12′29″E

Site history
- Built: 2nd half of 12th century
- In use: until 1639
- Fate: burned down in 1639

Lauterstein Castle, in German Burg Lauterstein, also called Burgruine Niederlauterstein, is a medieval castle in Niederlauterstein, town of Marienberg, Erzgebirgskreis, Saxony. It has been a ruin since the Thirty Years' War.

== Geography ==
Lauterstein castle is situated on a gneiss rock at the eastern end of Niederlauterstein village, above the left bank of Schwarze Pockau river, approximately 2 km north-west of Zöblitz and 4.5 km north-east of Marienberg.

== History ==
Archeological investigations in the 1970s have shown that the castle was built in the second half of the 12th century. It was first mentioned in writing in 1304 when a document named a Johannis in Lutirstein of the ministerial family of Erdmannsdorf in the castle. The castle was mainly built from stone, hence probably the name ending in -stein. Its purpose was the protection of a medieval trade route between Leipzig and Prague across the Ore Mountains.

The family of Schellenberg became lords of Lauenstein in the early 14th century. They lost their influence in 1323 after they lost a feud with Altzella Abbey, and margrave Frederick the Brave enfeoffed the burgraves Albrecht IV von Altenburg und Otto I von Leisnig, who had helped to support him and the abbey, with Lauterstein castle and the town of Zcobelin (Zöblitz).

Kaspar von Berbisdorf from Freiberg, an owner of mines and metalworks in the Ore Mountains, bought the lordship of Lauterstein for 4000 guilders from burgrave Otto II of Leisnig and Altenburg in 1434. His descendants Bastian and Melchior divided the lordship and the castle in 1497 into Oberlauterstein and Niederlauterstein. A fire damaged the castle in 1530, but it was rebuilt within a few years. In 1559, Prince-elector Augustus forced the Berbisdorf family to sell castle and lordship Lauterstein for 107,784 guilders and installed the administration of a Saxon Amt in the castle.

According to local tradition, on 14. March 1639, three Swedish horsemen set fire to the castle. It was not rebuilt and has remained a ruin since then. The administrative seat of Amt Lauterstein moved to Marienberg and later to Olbernhau and Zöblitz.

The Marienberg-based manufacturer of model railway accessories Auhagen produces a model of the castle, based on a 1629 depiction by Dillich, in the approximate scale of 1:100.

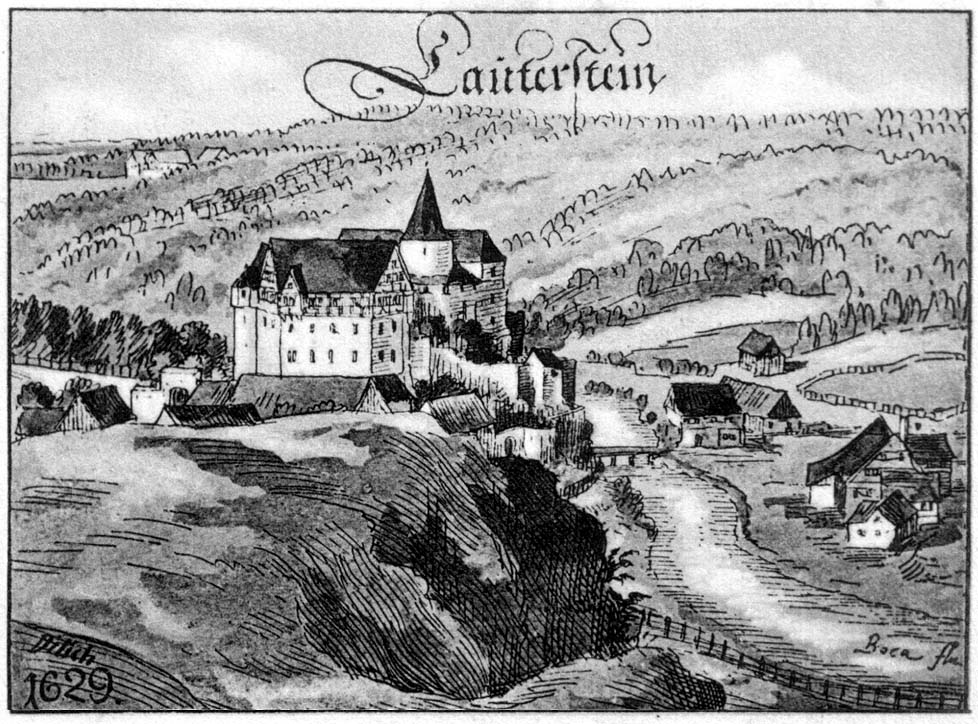
Lauterstein castle in 1629, after a drawing by Dillich

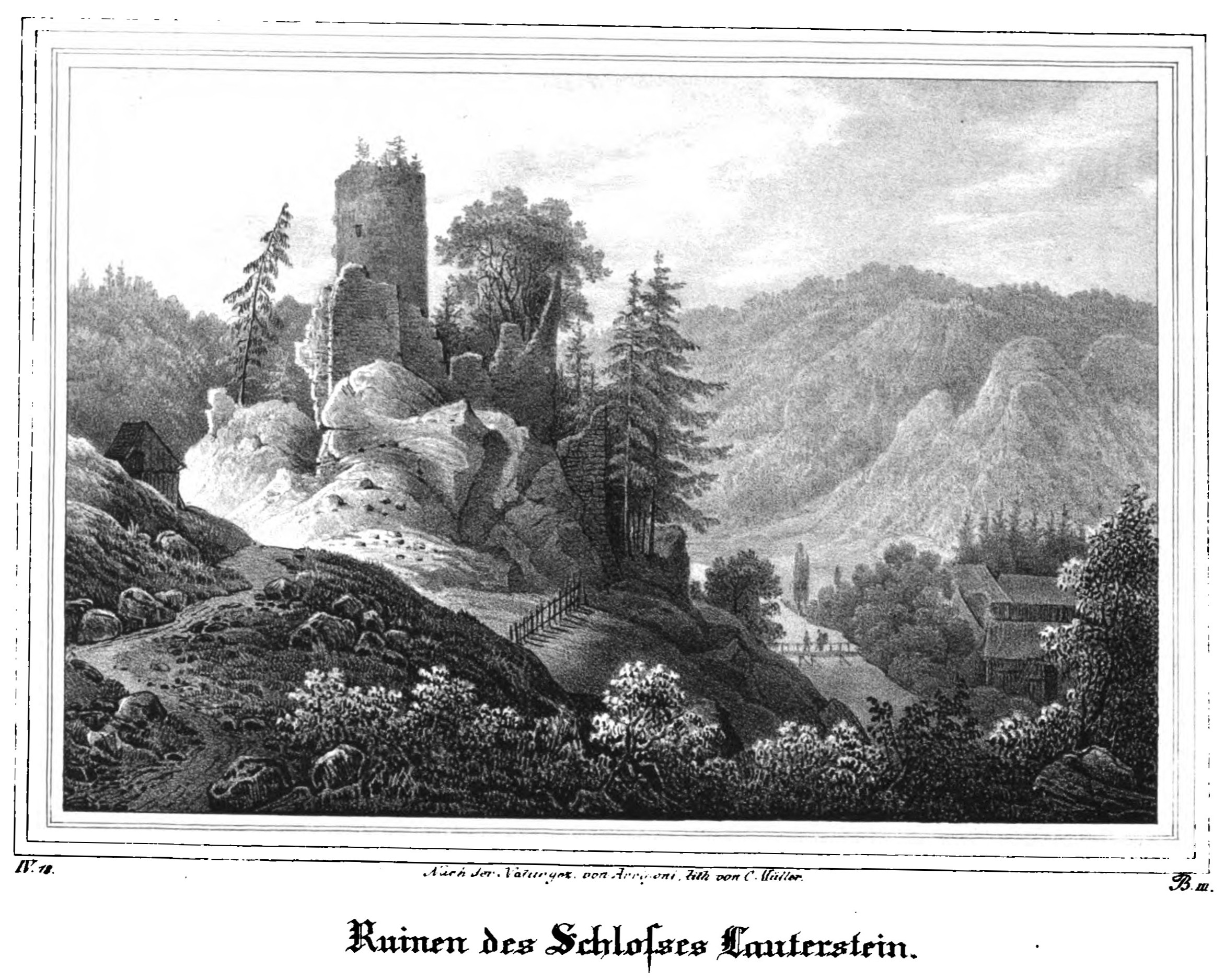
Ruins of Lauterstein castle in 1839

== Bibliography ==
- Carl W. Hering (1828). Geschichte des sächsischen Hochlandes: mit besonderer Beziehung auf das Amt Lauterstein und angrenzende Städte, Schlösser und Rittergüter. Vol. 1. Leipzig: Johann Ambrosius Barth.
