= Dreibrüderhöhe =

Mountain in Saxony, Germany

Highest point
- Elevation: 688.1 m (2,258 ft)
- Coordinates: 50°39′24″N 13°7′31″E

Geography
- Location: Saxony, Germany
- Parent range: Ore Mountains

Dreibrüderhöhe or short Brüderhöhe is a mountain of Saxony, southeastern Germany. It is located near Marienberg in Saxony and can reached by a road branching off Bundesstraße 171, or on hiking routes from Marienberg, Wolkenstein, Lauta, Großrückerswalde or Gehringswalde, among them the International Mountain Hiking Route Eisenach-Budapest (EB) which is now part of the E3 European long distance path.

== Etymology ==
The name of the mountain is derived from a nearby former mine called Alte Drei Brüder (Old Three Brothers) and originates in a legend, according to which three brothers from Italy had discovered a vein of silver ore there.

== Buildings ==
An 18 m tall observation tower was opened in May 1883 by the Marienberg branch of the Ore Mountain Club, founded in 1878. It had been constructed by Maschinenfabrik C. Reinsch, Dresden, at a cost of 6000 Mark. In 1884 the tower was named Prinzeß-Marien-Turm after the wife of then Prince Georg of Saxony. It became a popular touristic destination, so that in 1886 Gustav Loose, a member of the Marienberg branch of the Ore Mountain Club, opened a restaurant in the nearby mining office (Huthaus) Alte Drei Brüder which had been erected in 1853/1854. The mountain restaurant Dreibrüderhöhe remained property of the Loose family until 1977, when it was sold to Gebäudewirtschaft Marienberg (the municipal real estate management) who operated it until 1985. It then passed into the hands of the Marienberg Agricultural Production Cooperative who sold it in 1992. In 1992/1993 it was rebuilt into a hotel (Berghotel Drei Brüder Höhe).

After access to the 1883 observation tower had been banned by the building inspectorate for several years, and because it stood near a restricted military area, it was pulled down and scrapped in 1977. Later the borough of Marienberg had a new 25.4 m tall observation tower built which was opened on 12 May 1994. It grants a good view across Marienberg and its surroundings.

A slightly taller radio tower is located approximately 60 m north-east of the observation tower in a fenced-in area of restricted access.
