= Frank Müller (politician, born 1977) =

German politician (born 1977)

Member of the Landtag of North Rhine-Westphalia
- Incumbent
- Assumed office 1 June 2017

Personal details
- Born: 7 May 1977 (age 49) Marienberg
- Party: Social Democratic Party (since 1999)

Frank Müller (born 7 May 1977 in Marienberg) is a German politician serving as a member of the Landtag of North Rhine-Westphalia since 2017. He has served as chairman of the Social Democratic Party in Essen since 2021.
