= Freudenstein Castle =

Castle in Freiberg (Saxony)

Coordinates: 50°55′13.56″N 13°20′23.86″E

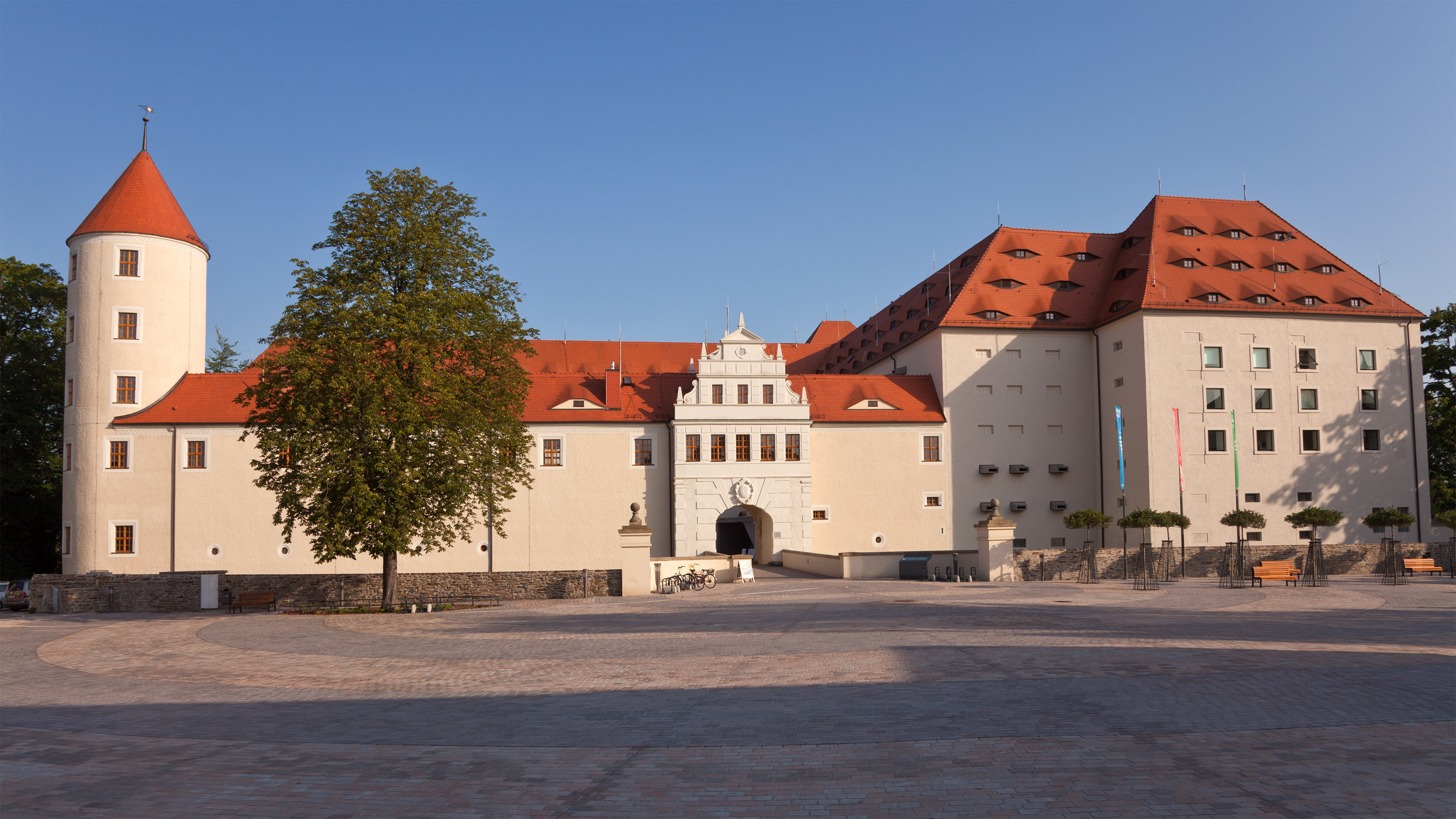
The front view

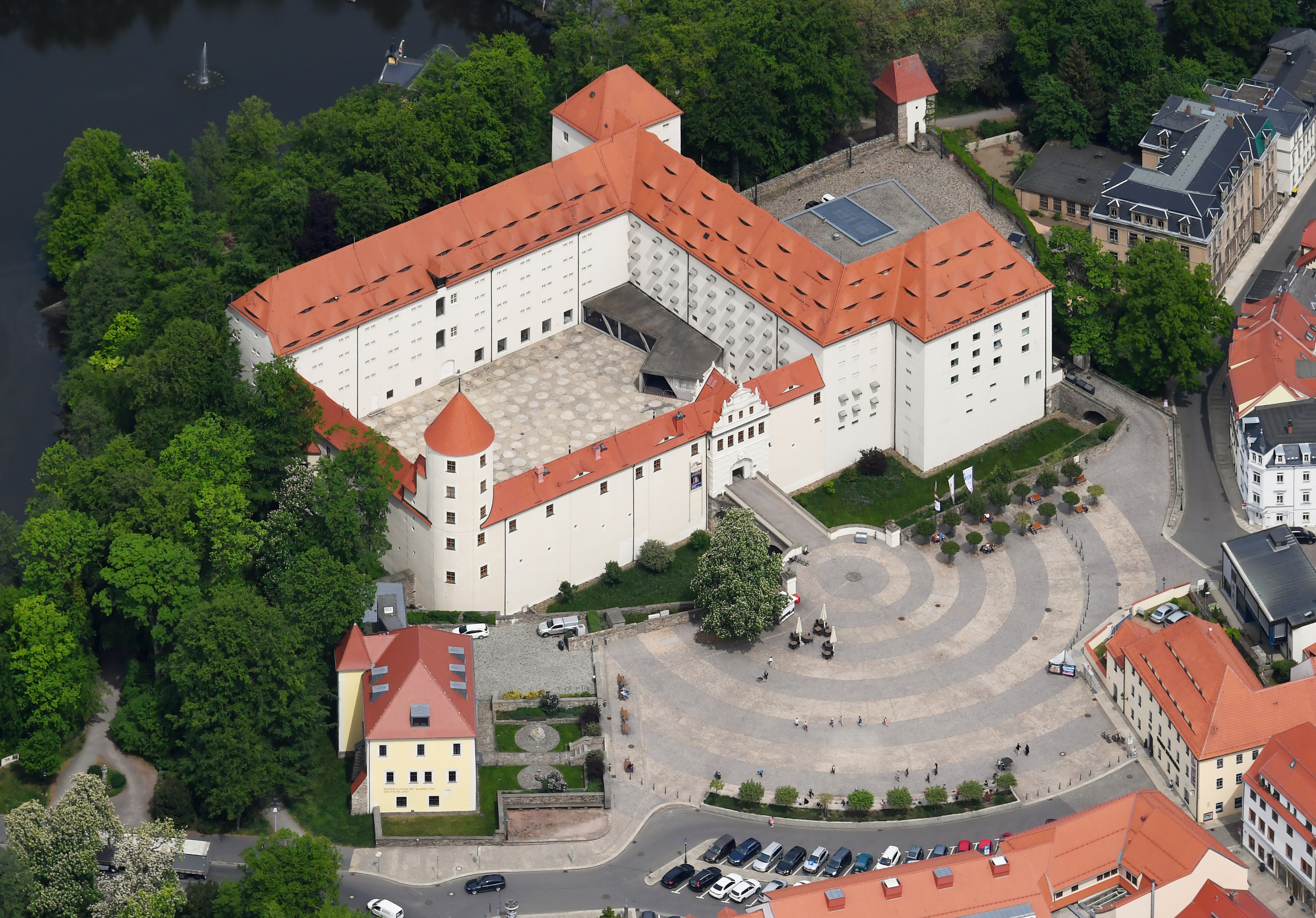
Aerial view

Freudenstein Castle (German: Schloss Freudenstein) is located on the Schloßplatz ("Castle Square") on the edge of the town centre of Freiberg in the German state of Saxony. Its history is closely linked to the House of Wettin. After several conversions the castle is now a stately home with four wings comprising these buildings: the Langes Haus, Neues Haus, Kirchenflügel, Großer Turm und Schmales Haus ("Long House", "New House", "Church Wing", "Great Tower" and "Narrow House").

== History ==
After the discovery of silver in Christiansdorf, Margrave Otto II of Meissen had a castle built in 1168 to protect the silver mines. On 31 July 1312 the castle is first mentioned in a record as a Hus ("house"). In later documents it is described as an arx, Castrum, flos and Burg. The Freiberg castle is first referred to as "Freudenstein" in 1525. After 1505 Duke Henry the Pious mainly resided in Freiberg. During his reign, his sons, later the electors of Saxony, Moritz and Augustus, were born at the castle.

The construction of the new castle was begun in 1566 by master builder, Hans Irmisch, under the supervision of Rochus zu Lynar. Its completion in the Renaissance architectural style was finished in 1577. In Thirty Years' War, it formed part of the defensive system of the town of Freiberg, and was occasionally used as a military base. In 1762, in consequence of the Seven Years' War, the interior of the castle was completely wrecked.

When ownership of the property was taken over by the military treasury in 1784, the second major conversion of the Renaissance palace into a magazine was carried out. This involved a major change to the building structure. The Renaissance windows were replaced by small armoury windows. Inside, low armoury floors were built in a simple design. From 1800, it was partly rebuilt into a miners' granary (Bergmagazin). During the Napoleonic occupation in 1813, the castle was used as a hospital for 1,500 wounded.

With the transfer of legal ownership to the town of Freiberg in 1957, it served until 1979 as a granary. In 1973, a youth club opened in the basement. From 1980 to 1990, a heritage organization was based at the castle. In a return to its structural appearance in 1577, the facade of the New House was rebuilt in the Renaissance style under its direction. In 2004, ownership of the castle was given back to the town of Freiberg. Between 2005 and 2008 it was converted as the result of a Europe-wide competition under the direction of AFF Architects Berlin/Chemnitz. This saw the gutting of the Church Wing, in order to house the mining archives. The "terra mineralia" exhibition was housed in the adjacent Long House.

== Literature ==
- Heinrich Douffet, Uwe Richter, Ulrich Thiel: Schloss Freudenstein in Freiberg. Die Herausbildung der Stadt Freiberg und die Anlage der Burg. In: Sächsische Heimatblätter. Vold. 54, No. 2, 2008, ISSN 0486-8234, pp. 172–184
- Heinrich Douffet, Uwe Richter: Zur Fertigstellung des Schlosses Freudenstein in Freiberg im Jahre 2008. in: Erzgebirgsverein e. V. (pub.): Jahrbuch für das Erzgebirge 2008. Marienberg, 2007, ISBN 978-3-931770-71-6, pp. 6–8
- Gerhard Heide, Christel-Maria Höppner, Steffen Jahn, Andreas Massanek, Uwe Richter: Glanzlichter aus der Welt der Mineralien. Die Pohl-Ströher-Mineraliensammlung Schloss Freudenstein/Freiberg. TU Bergakademie Freiberg, 2008, ISBN 978-3-86012-347-8
- Christian Weise, ed.: Freiberg, Mineralien, Bergbau & Museen, extraLapis No. 36, Munich, 2009, ISSN 0945-8492
