= Niederlauterstein =

- Ortsteil of Marienberg
- Interactive map of Niederlauterstein
- Location within Germany Location within Saxony
- Coordinates: 50°40′13″N 13°9′3″E
- Country: Germany
- State: Saxony
- District: Erzgebirgskreis
- Town: Marienberg

Area
  - Total: 3.052 km^{2} (1.178 sq mi)
- Elevation: 556 m (1,824 ft)

Population (2021)
  - Total: 626
  - Density: 205/km^{2} (531/sq mi)
- Time zone: UTC+01:00 (CET)
  - Summer (DST): UTC+02:00 (CEST)
- Postal codes: 09496
- Dialling codes: 03735

Niederlauterstein is a village in Saxony which has been incorporated into the town of Marienberg in the district Erzgebirgskreis since 1996.

== Geography ==
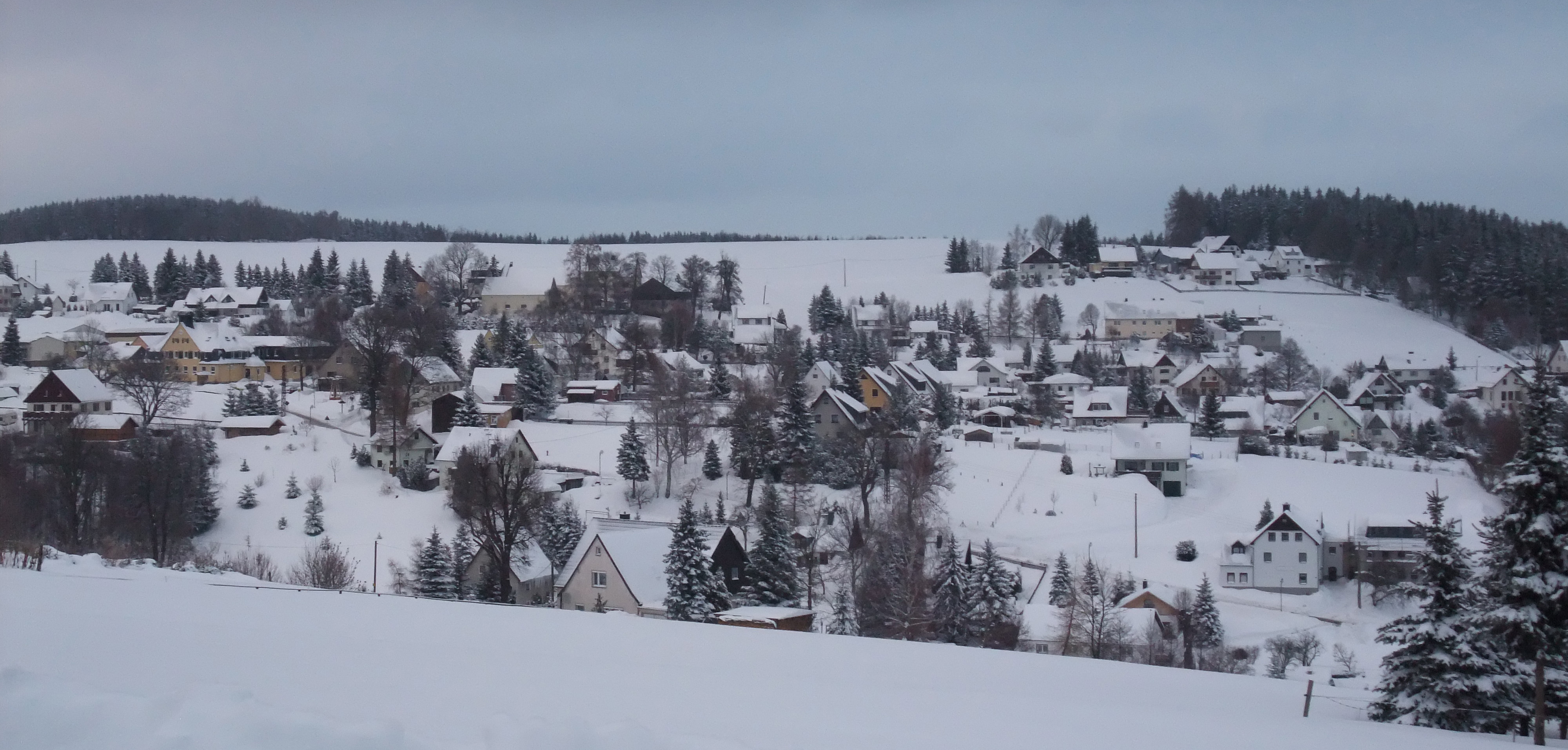
Niederlauterstein, seen from Marienberger Straße

Niederlauterstein is a dispersed settlement (Streusiedlung), situated about 3.5 km (2.2 mi) north-east of Marienberg in the Ore Mountains. It extends from the left bank of Schwarze Pockau river for about 1.5 km (0.93 mi) westward on a steep slope. The ruined Lauterstein Castle which formed the origin of the settlement is situated on a rock spur above the river, at the eastern end of the village.

A former miners' settlement dating back to the 12th century, the abandoned village Schwedengraben, is located about 1 km (0.62 mi) southwest of Niederlauterstein. To the east, Landesstraße 224 between Pockau und Kniebreche runs along the valley of Schwarze Pockau. Kreisstraße 8131 connects the western end of the village with Rittersberg and Kniebreche and with Lauta via Lauterbach.

== History ==
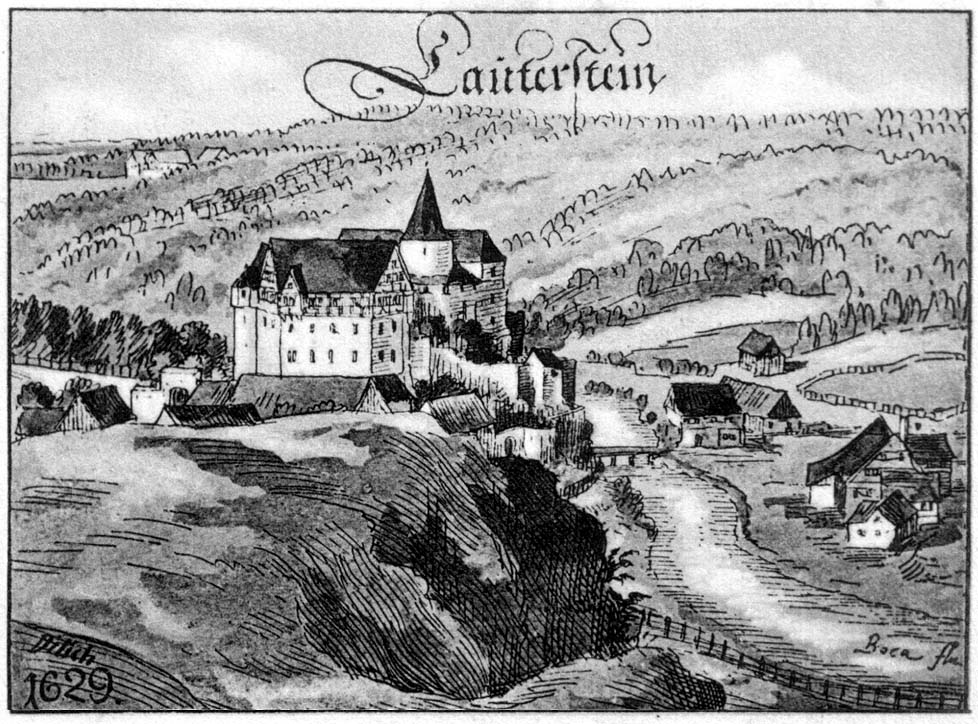
Lauterstein Castle and houses (after an ink drawing by W. Dillich, 1629)

The history of Niederlauterstein is closely connected with that of Lauterstein Castle, built in the second half of the 12th century and first mentioned in 1304, which was built to protect a medieval trade road between Leipzig and Prague across the Ore mountains. When castle and lordship were divided in 1497 into Nyder Sloß Lauttersteynn ("Lower castle Lauterstein") and zum Lawttersteyn, a dividing wall was erected across the castle courtyard.

Since 1539, after the Protestant Reformation Niederlauterstein has belonged to the parish of Lauterbach. In 1559, Prince-elector Augustus installed the administration of the Saxon Amt Lauterstein in the castle. The castle burned down in 1639 during the Thirty Years' War.

Beginning in 1698, the sale of the Vorwerke Neudeck-Schäferei, Schlossmühle and Schweizer Vorwerk was prepared. Carl Gottlieb Leubnitz, Georg Heinrich Dürrfeldt and Curth Heinrich Einsiedel, commission agents of the prince-elector, were instructed to negotiate the contract which was completed on 26 September 1701 and which was confirmed on 23 December 1701 by Augustus the Strong in Warsaw. The farming estates together with their tracts of land were sold to 31 buyers, among them subjects of the Amt and other applicants. Since the estates had been property of the castle's share since 1497, the new village arising from them was named Nieder Lauterstein in 1701.

A school was established in 1835 and a second one in 1884. Both were replaced by a new building in 1916 which is now used as a club house by the local history society. After Schlossmühle mill on the right bank of Schwarze Pockau burned down in 1860, a flax spinnery was built in its grounds in 1865. It burned down in 1888 and was replaced by a paper mill for the production of paperboard in 1893. It closed in 1965, only the former proprietor's villa has been preserved. The former manorial district of Schlossmühle was incorporated into Niederlauterstein in 1921.

On 1. Januar 1996 Niederlauterstein was incorporated into Marienberg.

== Inhabitants ==
Year	Inhabitants
1764	31 smallholders
1834	530
1871	703
1890	673
1910	632

Year	Inhabitants
1925	656
1939	696
1946	716
1950	745
1964	676

Year	Inhabitants
1990	573
1995	647
2007	729
2014	676
2015	673

Year	Inhabitants
2016	659
2021	626

== Bibliography ==
- Schumann, August (1820). "Niederlauterstein". Vollständiges Staats-, Post- und Zeitungslexikon von Sachsen (in German). Vol. 7. Zwickau. p. 272.
- Landratsamt Mittlerer Erzgebirgskreis, Hrsg.: Zur Geschichte der Städte und Gemeinden im Mittleren Erzgebirgskreis, Eine Zeittafel (Teile 1–3)
- Carl W. Hering (1828). Geschichte des sächsischen Hochlandes: mit besonderer Beziehung auf das Amt Lauterstein und angrenzende Städte, Schlösser und Rittergüter. Vol. 1. Leipzig: Johann Ambrosius Barth.
