= Lauterbacher Tropfen =

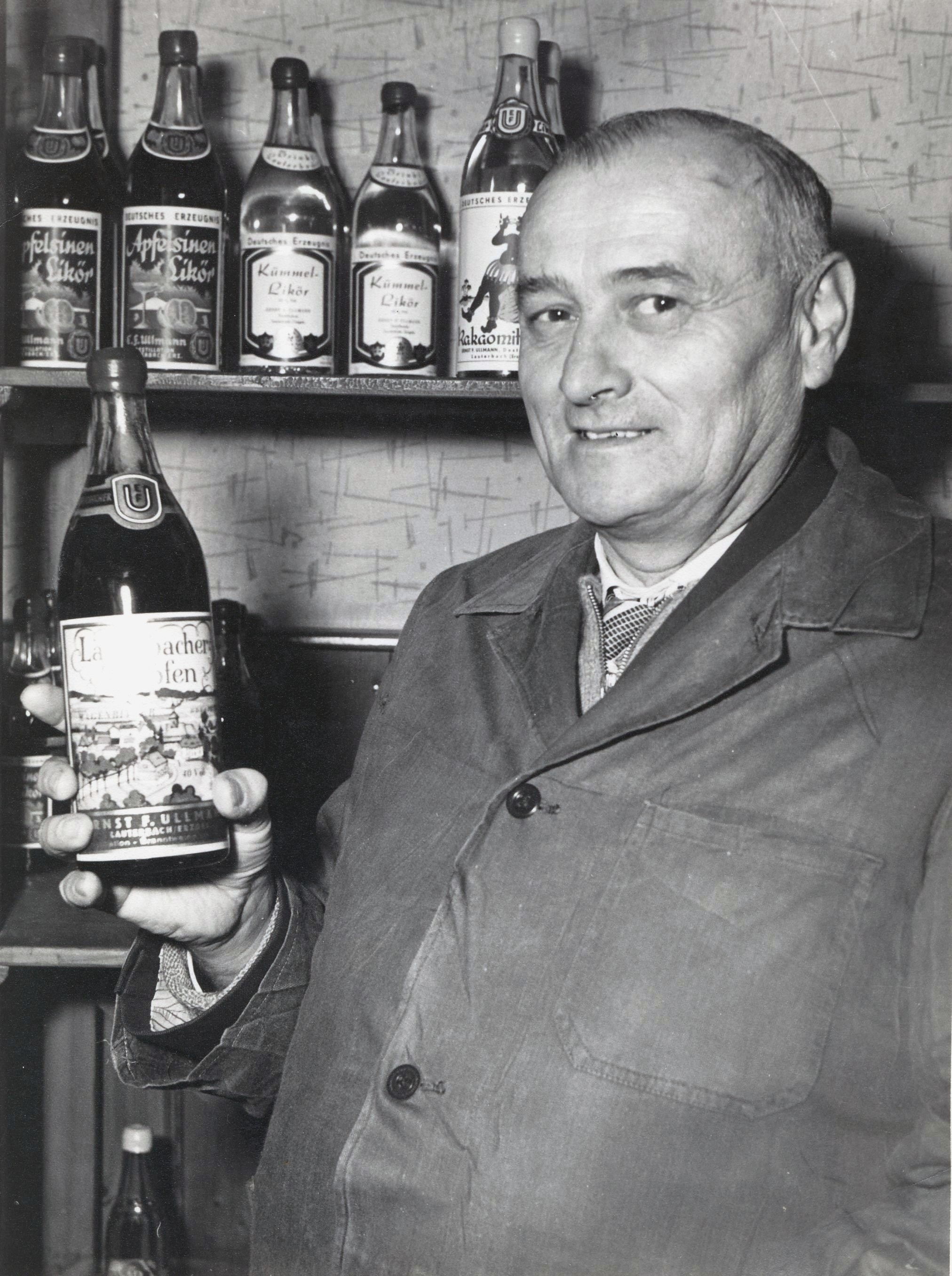
Ernst F. Ullmann junior with his product in the 1950s

Lauterbacher Tropfen is a bitters that is manufactured and bottled in the Ore Mountain village of Lauterbach in the borough of Marienberg. The bitters is known for its aromatic taste and dark green colour. The recipe is a company secret. According to the company the spirit is unsweetened.

The bitters contains 40% alcohol by volume. It is best drunk chilled. The herbal extract is produced by maceration and distillation.

The firm was founded in 1899 and is still run by the same family.

== Literature ==
- Günter Baldauf: Der Schmiedfritzaugust - ein erzgebirgisches Original aus Lauterbach. In: Erzgebirgische Heimatblätter. 19. Jahrgang, Heft 1/1997, pp. 21–22, ISSN 0232-6078
- Manfred Blechschmidt: Das erzgebirgische Kräuterbuch. Altis, Friedrichsthal, 1998, ISBN 3-910195-19-9.
- Birgit Bobach: Profile aus dem Mittleren Erzgebirge. Band 1. Schäfer, Limbach-Oberfrohna, 2000, ISBN 3-933322-11-1.
- Helga Kaden, Heinz Kaden: Phantasten, Käuze, Wunderheiler. Das Buch der erzgebirgischen Originale. Altis, Friedrichsthal, 2003, ISBN 3-91019541-5.
- Mächtige Erleichterung. In: Der Spiegel. No. 8, 1994, pp. 105b–107 (online).
