= Lauta (Marienberg) =

- Ortsteil of Marienberg
- Interactive map of Lauta
- Location within Germany Location within Saxony
- Coordinates: 50°40′N 13°9′E
- Country: Germany
- State: Saxony
- District: Erzgebirgskreis
- Town: Marienberg

Area
  - Total: 3.487 km^{2} (1.346 sq mi)
- Elevation: 621 m (2,037 ft)

Population (2021)
  - Total: 344
  - Density: 98.7/km^{2} (256/sq mi)
- Time zone: UTC+01:00 (CET)
  - Summer (DST): UTC+02:00 (CEST)
- Postal codes: 09496
- Dialling codes: 03735

Lauta is a village in the Saxon town of Marienberg in the German district of Erzgebirgskreis.

== Geography ==
Lauta lies about 2 kilometres northwest of Marienberg in the Ore Mountains. Southwest of Lauta lies the 688 m above sea level (NN) high Dreibrüderhöhe, southeast of the village is the 655 m above NN high Lautaer Höhe.
Until the opening of the Marienberg ring road in 2007 the B 174 federal road from Chemnitz to Reitzenhain passed through the village. Since then it has run past Lauta to the north and east. There is a road to Lauterbach, the Kreisstraße 8131.

== History ==
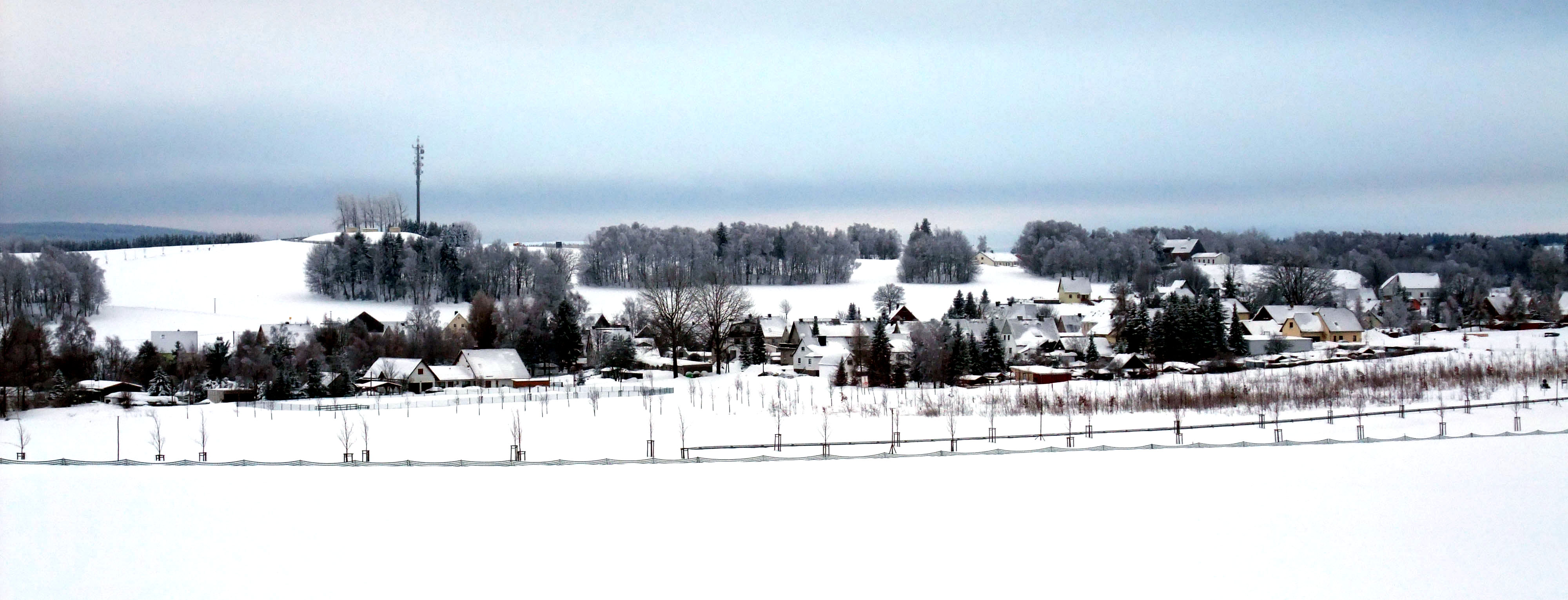
Lauta seen from the north

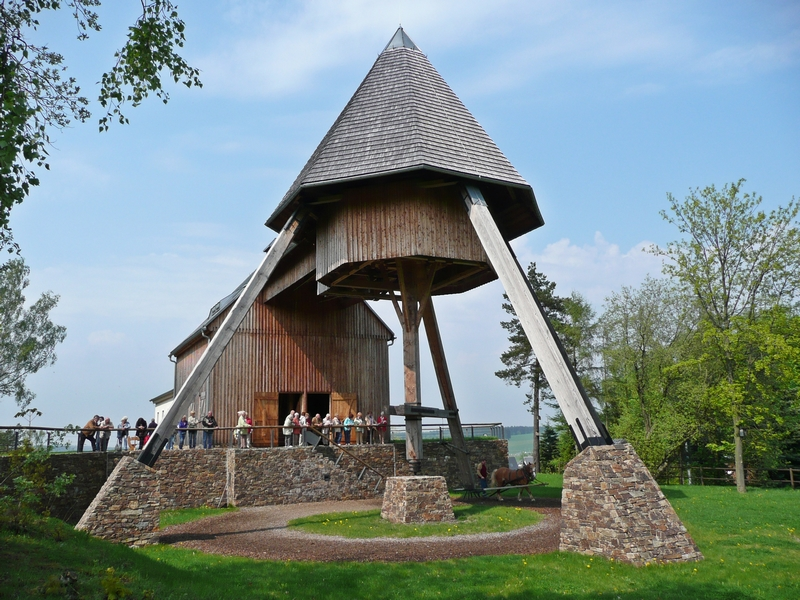
Replica open horse gin on the Rudolphschacht mineshaft

Lauta was first mentioned in 1434 as die Lute. Mining started in 1523 with Bauernzeche pit on the ore vein Bauer Morgengang. Following the Protestant Reformation Lauta became part of Lauterbach parish in 1539, and on 1 October 1875 it became part of Marienberg parish. By way of reciprocation, some mine buildings near Rittersberg and two mine buildings which used to belong to Niederlauterstein, together with 27 inhabitants, were transferred to Lauterbach parish in 1897. A school was built in 1766. According to August Schumann, Lauta had 230 inhabitants in 1818.

Today's B 174 was routed through Lauta in 1833. A rare mineral that was found in 1881 in Rudolph-Schacht mine was examined by the Freiberg mineralogist A. Frenzel and was named Lautite. Silver mining in Rudolph-Schacht ceased in 1899. A horse gin was in operation there between 1838 and 1877, and a faithful replica of it was built in the 1990s. The associated visitor centre houses an exhibition on "Mining in the Marienberg mining district". The mining landscape near Lauta has been selected to support the application of Ore Mountain Mining Region for the status of a World Heritage Site.

In 1883 an 18-metre-high tower was erected on the nearby Dreibrüderhöhe and named "Prinzeß-Marien-Turm" in 1884. This tower was pulled down in 1977, and replaced in 1994.

Lauta was connected to the electrical distribution network in 1925. Between 1929 and 1935 Rudolph-Schacht mine was reopened as a water supply. The water is fed into the Neunzehnhain II reservoir which supplies the city of Chemnitz.

On 1 January 1994 Lauta was merged with Marienberg.
