= Gehringswalde =

- Village of Wolkenstein
- Interactive map of Gehringswalde
- Location within Germany Location within Saxony
- Coordinates: 50°39′35″N 13°5′23″E
- Country: Germany
- State: Saxony
- District: Erzgebirgskreis
- Town: Wolkenstein
- Elevation: 477 m (1,565 ft)

Population (2011)
  - Total: 458
- Time zone: UTC+01:00 (CET)
  - Summer (DST): UTC+02:00 (CEST)
- Postal codes: 09429
- Dialling codes: 037369
- Vehicle registration: ERZ

Gehringswalde, a so-called Waldhufendorf, is situated about 1.5 km east of Wolkenstein in the Ore Mountains. It extends for about 1.5 km along the valley of a stream which joins the Zschopau river ca. 1.5 km west of Warmbad. The nearby Hüttengrundmühle (site of a former water mill) is also part of the village. The mountain Dreibrüderhöhe lies ca. 3 km east of Gehringswalde.

Bundesstraße 101 forms the main road of the village, at whose western end it is joined by Bundesstraße 171. A county road connects Gehringswalde with Warmbad.

== History ==
Gehringswalde was first mentioned in 1427 as Geringiswalde. After the Protestant Reformation it became part of Wolkenstein parish in 1536/37. In 1540 it was known as Gerichtswalde. From this time on there are reports of ore mining in Gehringswalde. The village was centred on the demesne of the prince-elector. In 1693, possibly as a consequence of the Thirty Years' War, of the need for water in the mines, and of damages due to increasing numbers of wild animals, there were only 5 Hufners, 8 half-Hufners, and 10 cotters, signifying pronounced poverty, and causing the local judges to ask for reductions of taxes.

In 1816 Gehringswalde had according to August Schumann 45 houses, 221 inhabitants who kept 123 heads of cattle and 100 sheep, and some mills. The road through the village was renewed between 1823 and 1829. The first school is mentioned in 1824, a new schoolhouse was built in 1874. In 1846 the grange of Huth was transferred from Großrückerswalde to Gehringswalde. Until 1856 the village was part of Amt Wolkenstein.

Municipal offices were built in 1925, the volunteer fire department was formed two years later. An aerial attack in the night from 14 to 15 February 1945 destroyed 26 buildings.

On 1 January 1999 the hitherto separate municipalities of Falkenbach, Gehringswalde, Hilmersdorf and Schönbrunn joined the town of Wolkenstein and became subdivisions thereof.
