= Bergmagazin =

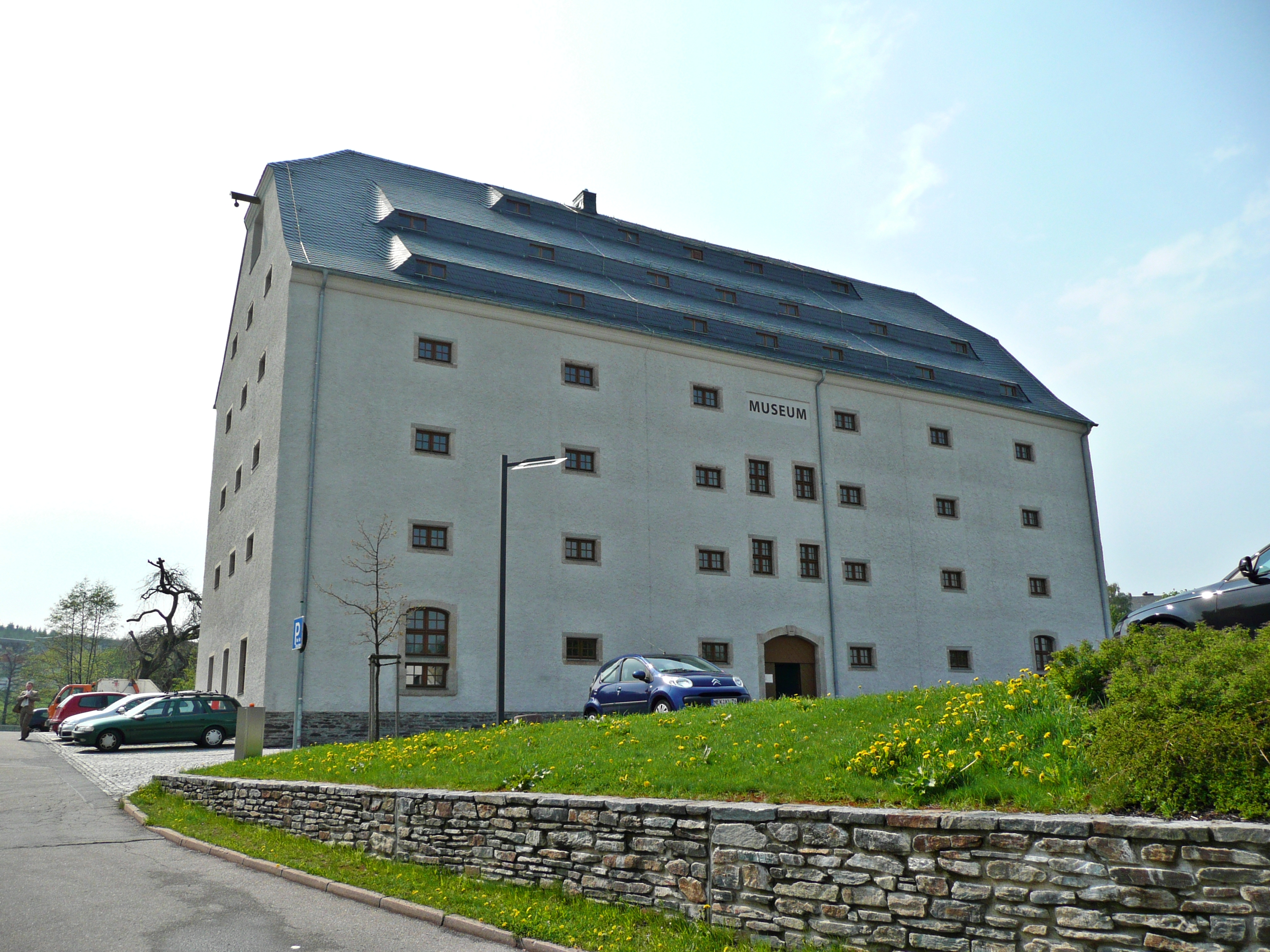
Marienberg's Bergmagazin

A Bergmagazin is a building that served as a granary for miners and the population of mining towns in German-speaking Europe.

== History (Saxony) ==
The construction of Bergmagazins in the Electorate and Kingdom of Saxony grew rapidly from 1806 at the suggestion of senior mining official (Oberberghauptmann), Friedrich Wilhelm Heinrich von Trebra. As a result of the great famines in the upper Ore Mountains at the end of the 18th century caused by several poor harvests, Trebra recommended the construction of multi-storey, stone Bermagazin buildings where grain could be deposited after harvesting and stored for several months or even years.

== Locations (a selection) ==
- Marienberg: built 1806-1809, from 1858 it had many other uses e.g. as a military storage facility, chocolate factory, glider school, war refugee accommodation and fruit store. Following its conversion and redesign it has been used as a museum since 2006.
- Annaberg
- Schneeberg
- Freiberg: 1784-1805 converted from Freudenstein Castle into the Bergmagazin. Used as a granary until 1979
- Johanngeorgenstadt: built 1806-1812, used as a grain store until 1847. After a fire in 1899 it was converted into a residence. Demolished in 2005
- Osterode am Harz: 1719-1722 built as a corn store. Used as the town council building since 1989

== Gallery ==
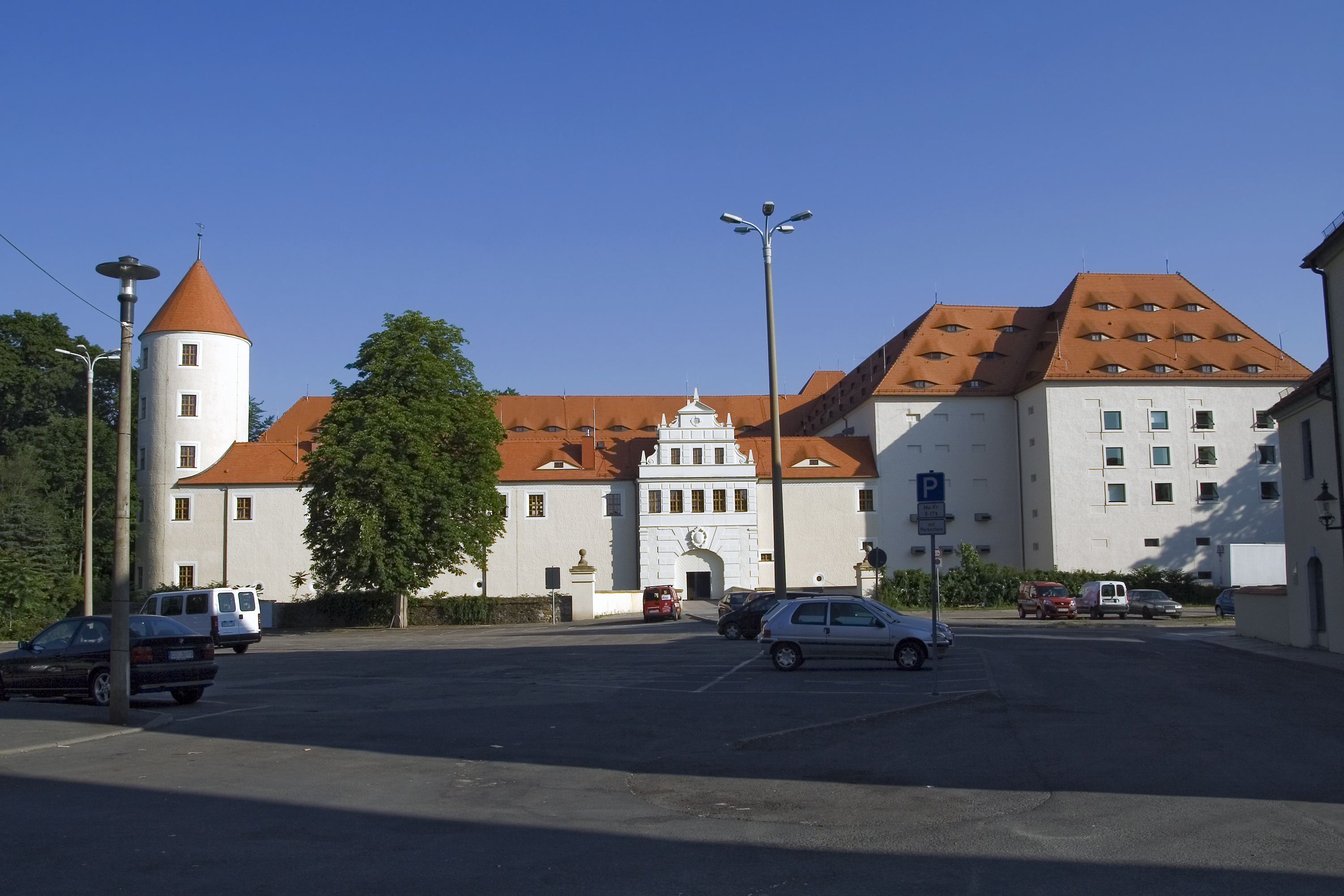
Freudenstein Castle, used since 1784 as a Bergmagazin

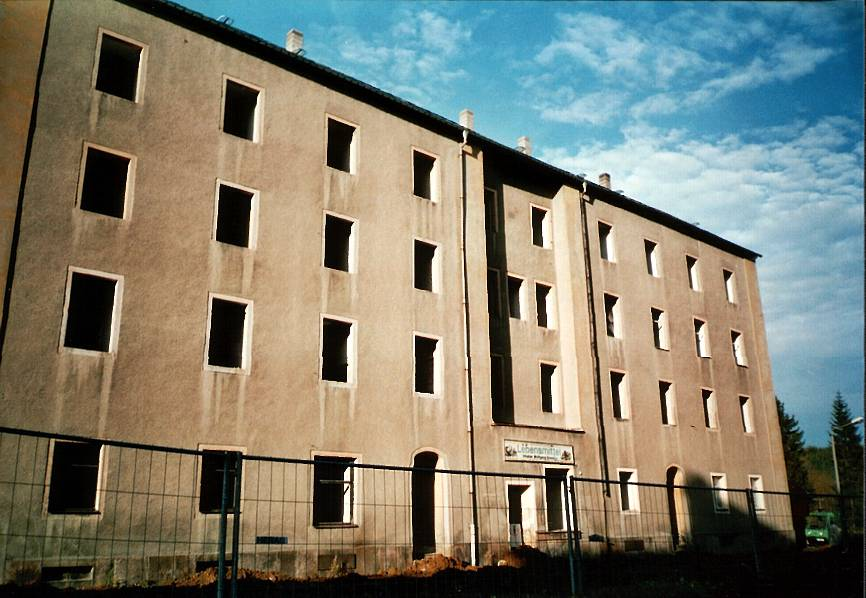
Johanngeorgenstadt Bergmagazin just before its demolition in 2005

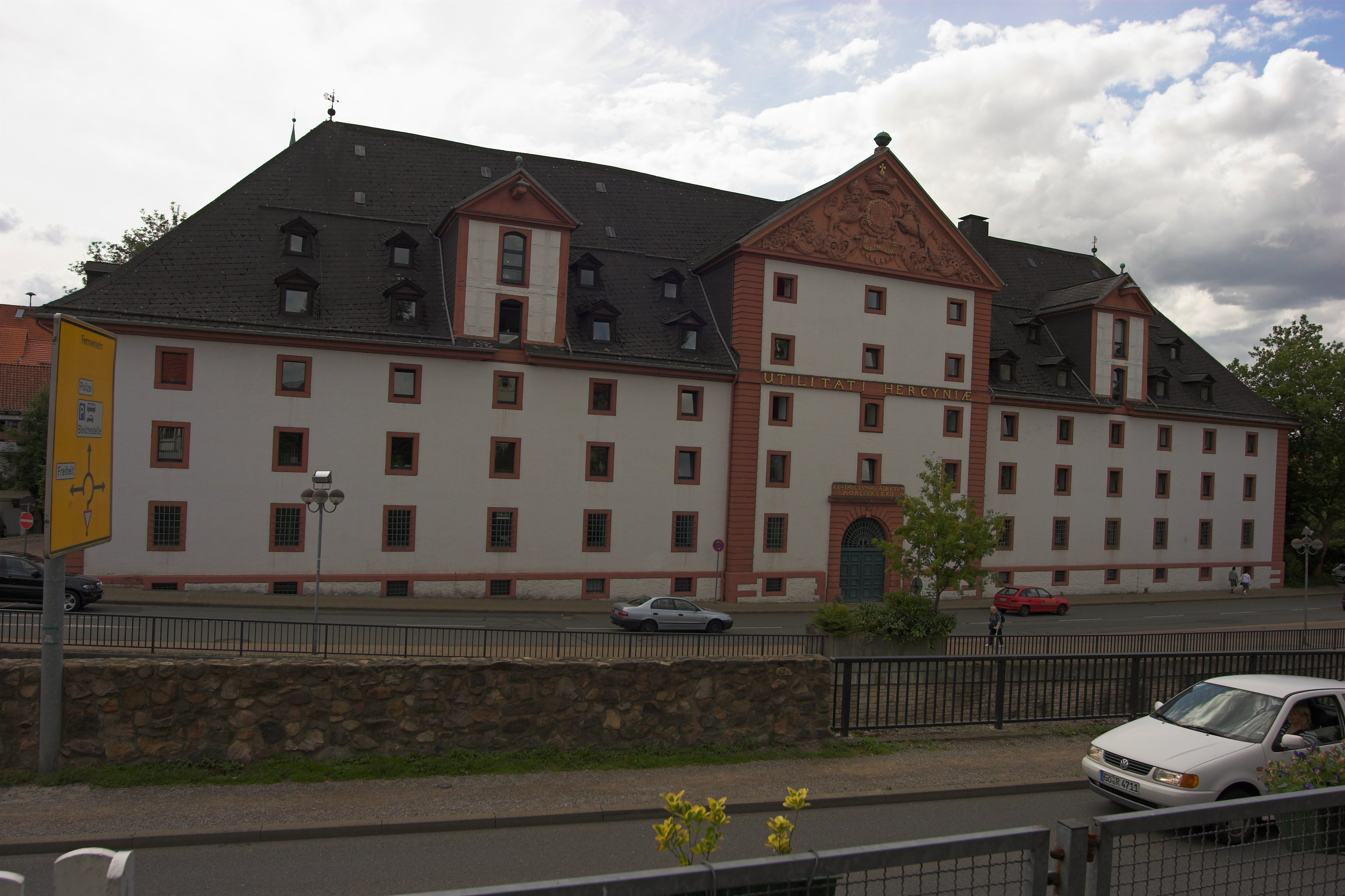
Osterode am Harz Bergmagazin (corn store in the Harz)
