= Zöblitz =

- Stadtteil of Marienberg
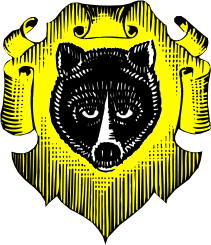
- Coat of arms
- Interactive map of Zöblitz
- Location within Germany Location within Saxony
- Coordinates: 50°39′27″N 13°13′54″E
- Country: Germany
- State: Saxony
- District: Erzgebirgskreis
- Town: Marienberg

Area
  - Total: 22.14 km^{2} (8.55 sq mi)
- Elevation: 600 m (2,000 ft)

Population (2021)
  - Total: 1,681
  - Density: 75.93/km^{2} (196.6/sq mi)
- Time zone: UTC+01:00 (CET)
  - Summer (DST): UTC+02:00 (CEST)
- Postal codes: 09517
- Dialling codes: 037363
- Vehicle registration: ERZ
- Website: www.zoeblitz.eu

Zöblitz (German pronunciation: [ˈtsøːblɪts]) is a town in the district Erzgebirgskreis, in Saxony, Germany. It is situated in the Ore Mountains, 5 kilometres (3.1 miles) east of Marienberg, and 30 kilometres (18.6 miles) southeast of Chemnitz. Since 31 December 2012, it is part of the municipality of Marienberg.
