= Henry of Saxony =

Henry of Saxony may refer to:

- Henry the Fowler, Duke of Saxony as Henry I
- Henry the Proud, Duke of Saxony as Henry II
- Henry the Lion, Duke of Saxony as Henry III
- Henry IV, Duke of Saxony

== See also ==
- Heinrich, Duke of Saxe-Merseburg
- Heinrich of Saxe-Weissenfels, Count of Barby
- Henry, Duke of Saxe-Römhild
