= Hirtstein =

Mountain in Marienberg, Germany

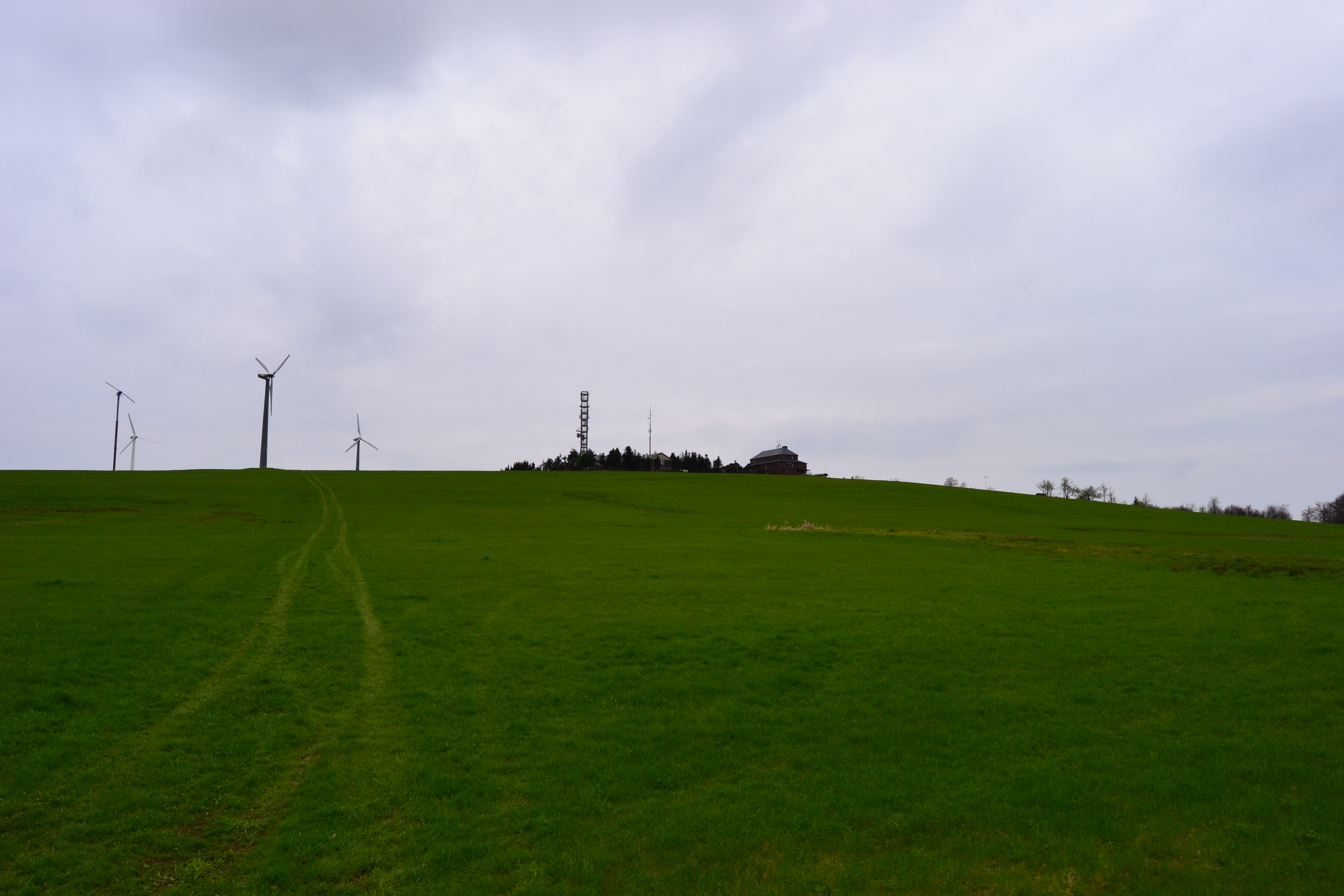
- Hirtstein from south-east

Highest point
- Elevation: 890 m (2,920 ft)
- Coordinates: 50°33′08.6″N 13°11′35.2″E

Geography
- Location within Saxony
- Location: Saxony, Germany
- Parent range: Ore Mountains

Hirtstein is a mountain of Saxony, in southeastern Germany. It is situated near the village Satzung, in the Ore Mountains, about 1.5 km from the border with the Czech Republic. Its elevation is 890 m.

== Geology ==
Hirtstein is a gneiss knoll with an intrusion of volcanic rock, commonly referred to as basalt and specifically identified as clinopyroxene-melanephelinite, whose fan shape has been exposed by quarry operations. This formation was deemed worthy of protection already in the 19th century and was spared from quarrying. In 2006 it was declared a National Geotope of Germany. Minerals such as augite, magnetite, nepheline, olivine and perovskite have been identified in samples from the basaltic fan of Hirtstein.

== Tourism ==
The mountain restaurant Hirtsteinbaude was opened on 11 September 1927. It offers accommodation for tourists.

In winter, several cross-country ski runs are prepared around the mountain. A short downhill ski, sledding, and snow tube run with a ski lift is located next to the restaurant. The cross-border long-distance skiing trail Skimagistrale Erzgebirge/Krušné hory and the long-distance footpath Kammweg Erzgebirge-Vogtland traverse Hirtstein.

== Gallery ==
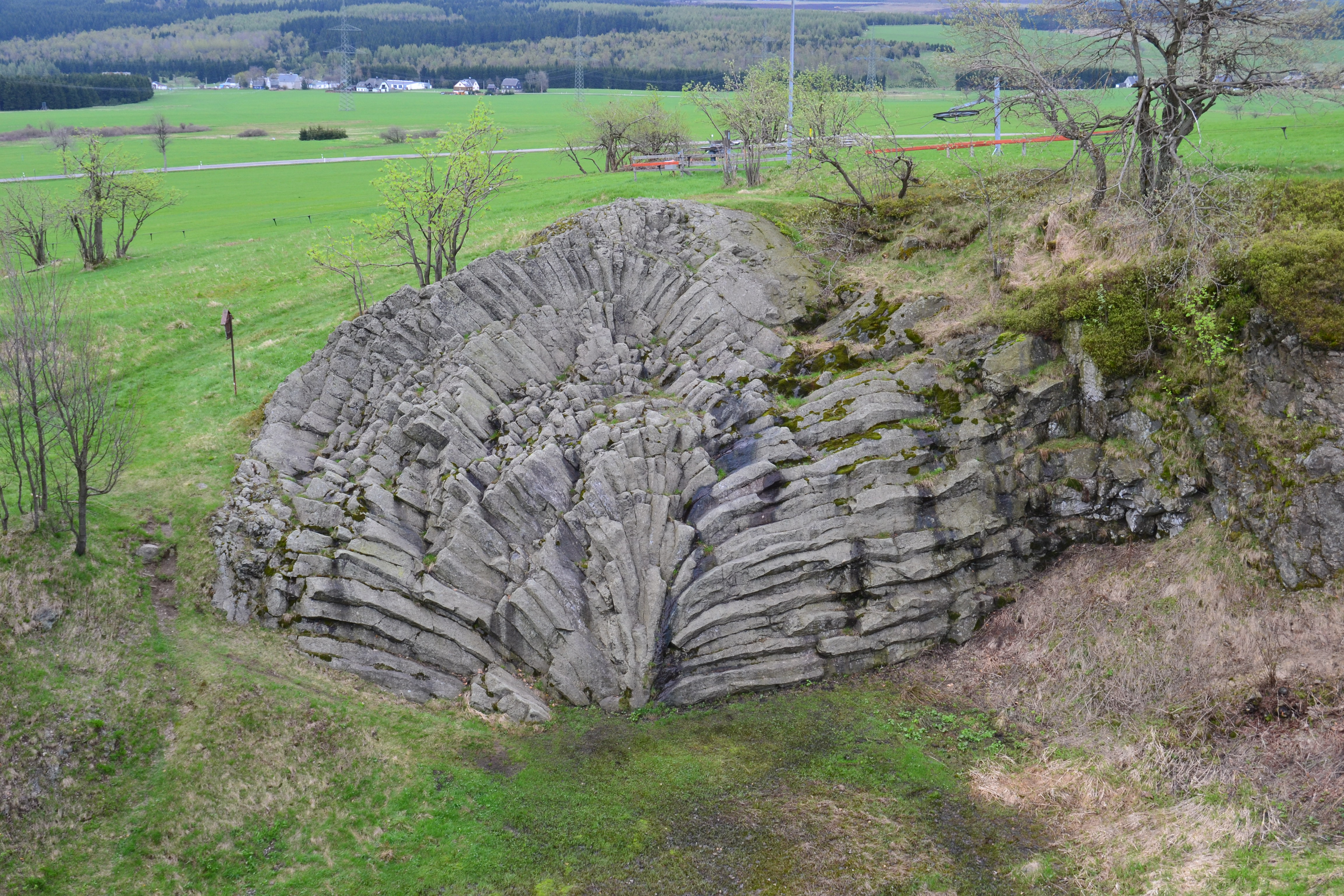
Basalt fan in a former quarry

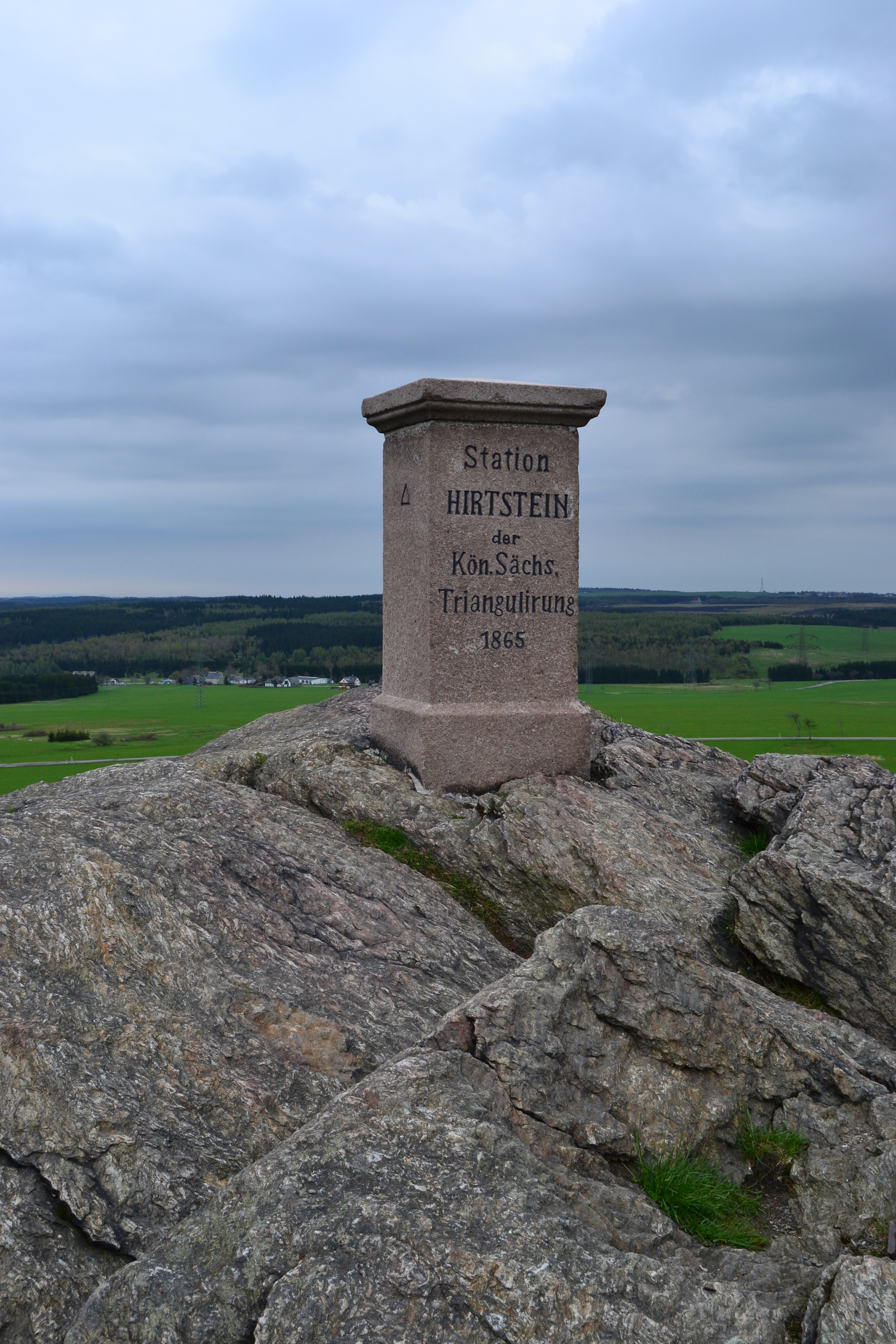
Triangulation post

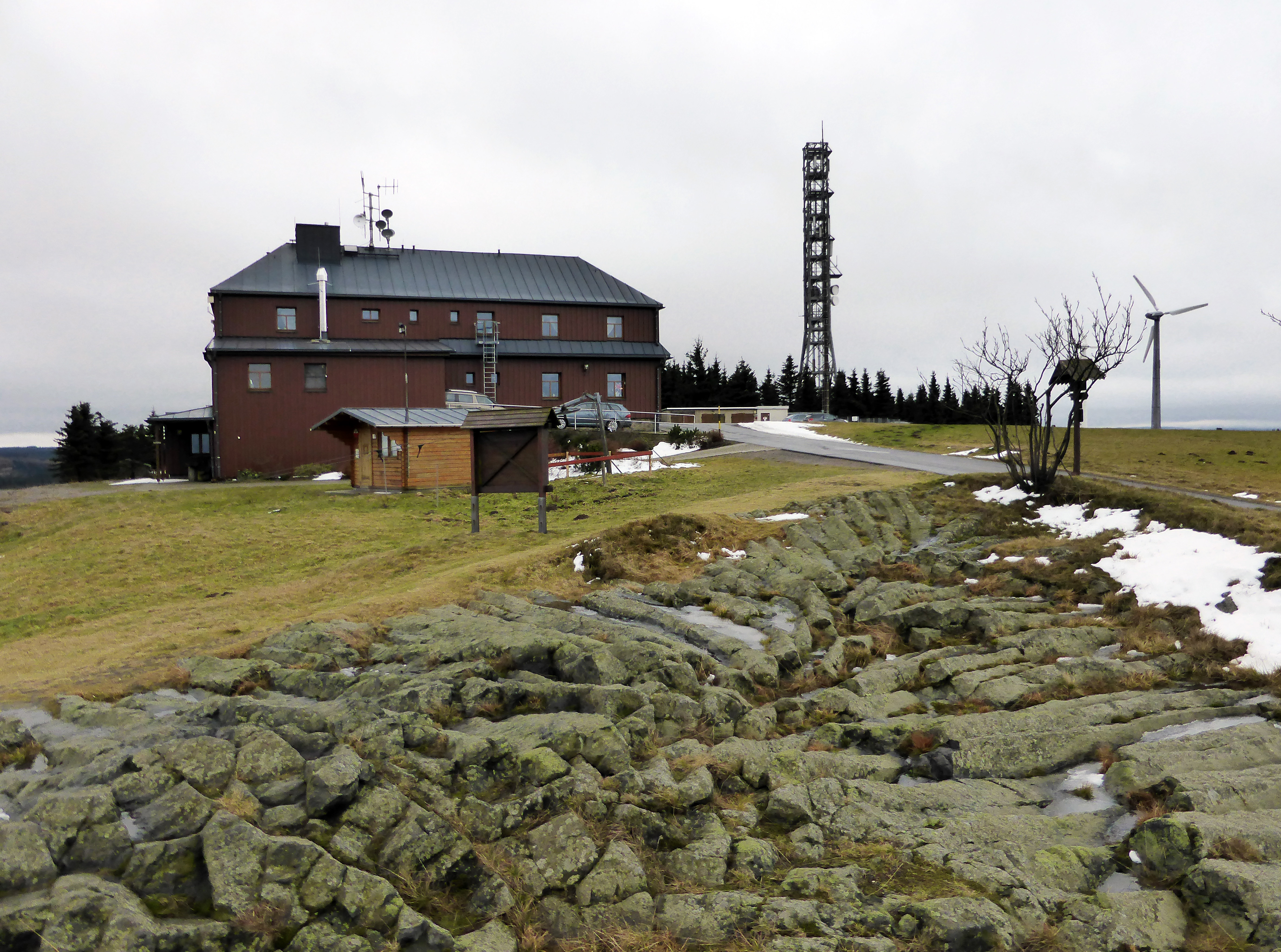
Hirtsteinbaude mountain restaurant

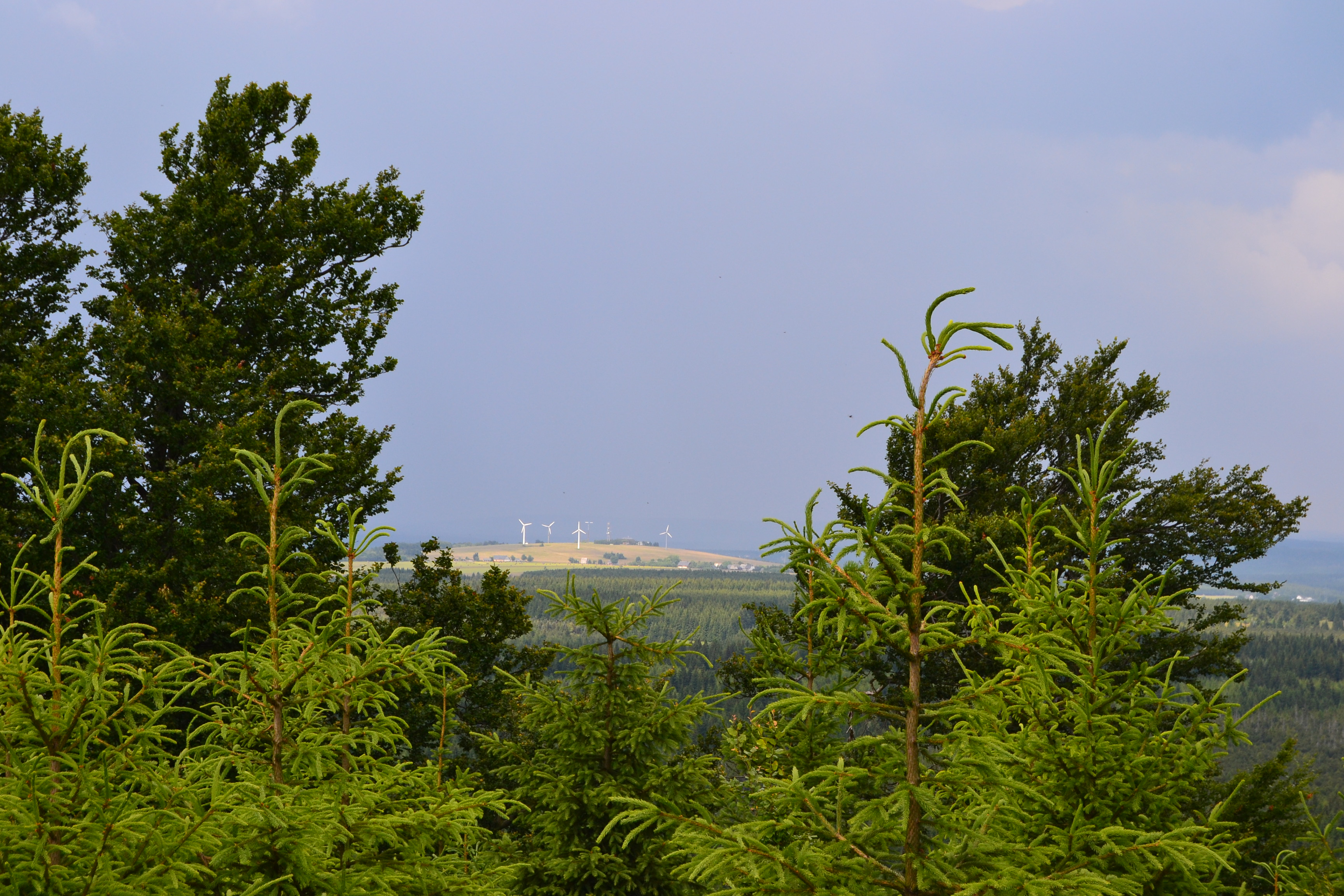
Hirtstein seen from Jelení hora
