= Satzung =

- Ortsteil of Marienberg
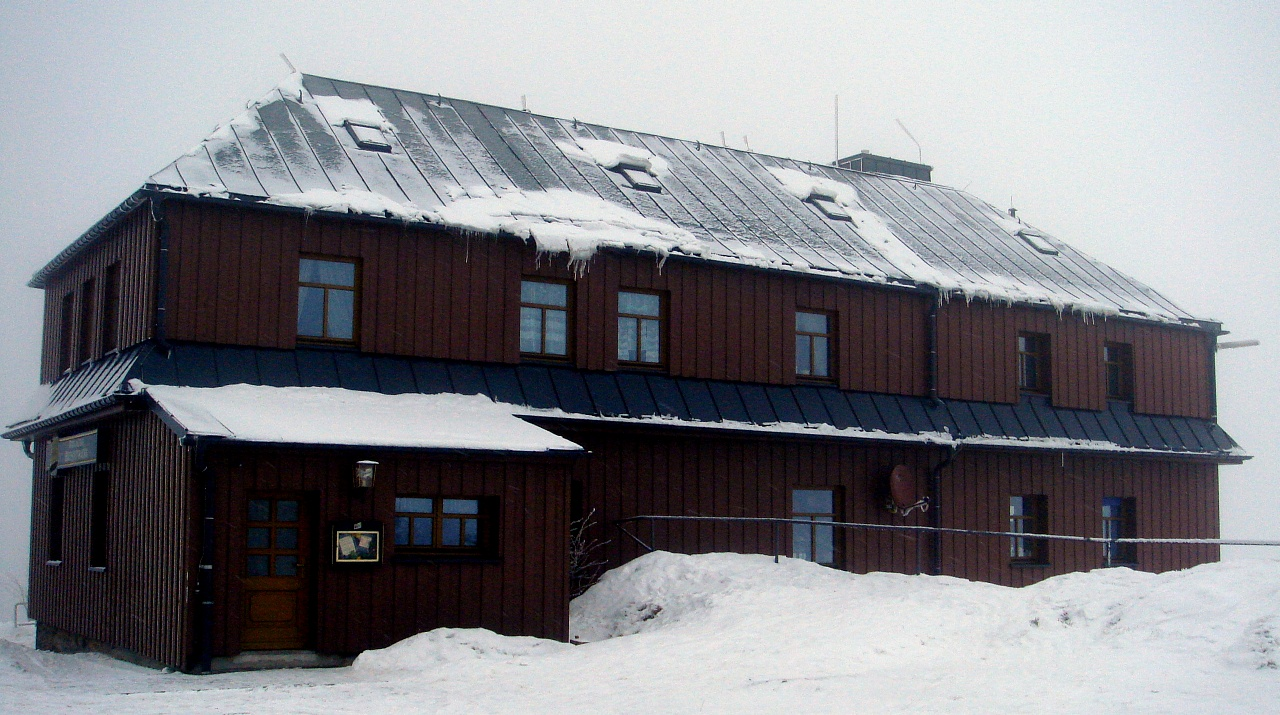
- Hirtstein mountain hut (Hirtsteinbaude)

- Coat of arms
- Interactive map of Satzung
- Location within Germany Location within Saxony
- Coordinates: 50°31′37″N 13°11′42″E
- Country: Germany
- State: Saxony
- District: Erzgebirgskreis
- Town: Marienberg

Area
  - Total: 6.614 km^{2} (2.554 sq mi)
- Elevation: 840 m (2,760 ft)

Population (2021)
  - Total: 502
  - Density: 75.9/km^{2} (197/sq mi)
- Time zone: UTC+01:00 (CET)
  - Summer (DST): UTC+02:00 (CEST)
- Postal codes: 09496
- Dialling codes: 037364

Satzung is a village in the Saxon municipality of Marienberg, which is in the district of Erzgebirgskreis in the German Ore Mountains.

== Geography ==
Satzung lies about 12 kilometres south of Marienberg in the Ore Mountains on the German-Czech border. Dense forests separate the village on both the German and Czech sides from its neighbours. Only the field clearings of the abandoned village of Jilmová in the east border immediately on those of Satzung. About 1 kilometre north of the village centre lies the 890-metre-high Hirtstein, some 4 kilometres south-southwest, on Czech territory, lies the 993-metre-high Jelení hora (Haßberg). The Black Pockau river flows eastwards here, marking the state border. The K 8104 district road (Kreisstraße) runs through the village, joining the Staatsstraße 216 running northward from Reitzenhain to Olbernhau.

== Population development ==
Year	Population
1551	26 farmers (besessene Mann), 7 tenants (Inwohner)
1764	46 farmers, 44 cottagers (Häusler), 5¾ oxgangs (Hufen)
1834	1203
1871	1543

Year	Population
1890	1459
1910	1172
1925	1221
1939	1101

Year	Population
1946	1225
1950	1192
1964	974
1990	741

== Personalities ==
- Luise Pinc, Ore Mountain dialect poet and singer.
- Erich Lang, regional poet
- Horst Heidrich, Forester General (Generalforstmeister) of the GDR and Deputy Minister for State Economy, Forestry and Food Commodities

== Literature ==
- Schumann, August (1823). "Satzung". Vollständiges Staats-, Post- und Zeitungslexikon von Sachsen (in German). Vol. 10. Zwickau. p. 176.
- Die Parochie Satzung. in: Neue Sächsische Kirchengalerie, Ephorie Marienberg. Strauch Verlag, Leipzig, pp. 672–688 (digitalised)
- Landratsamt Mittlerer Erzgebirgskreis, Hrsg.: Zur Geschichte der Städte und Gemeinden im Mittleren Erzgebirgskreis, Eine Zeittafel (parts 1-3)
- Richard Steche: Satzung. In: Beschreibende Darstellung der älteren Bau- und Kunstdenkmäler des Königreichs Sachsen, 5. Volume: Amtshauptmannschaft Marienberg. C. C. Meinhold, Dresden, 1885, p. 27.
