= Marienberg =

Town in Saxony, Germany

- Town
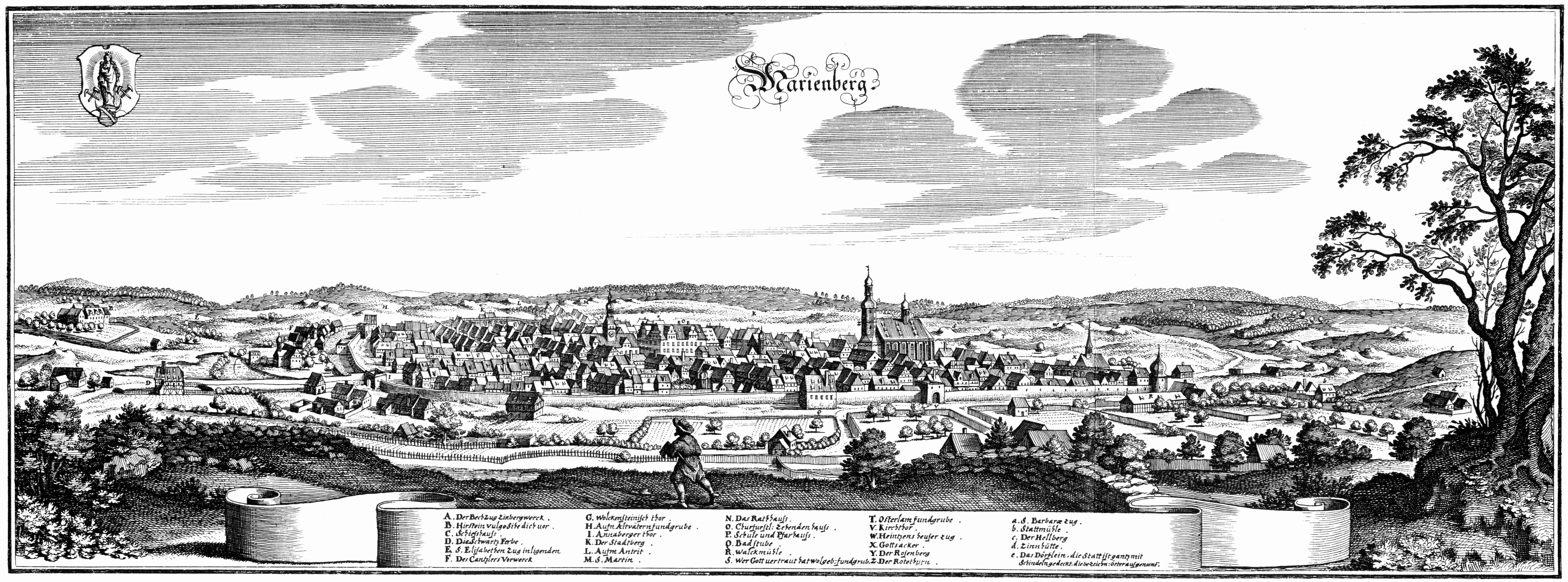
- Marienberg in 1650

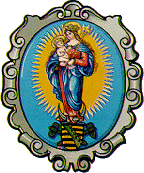
- Coat of arms

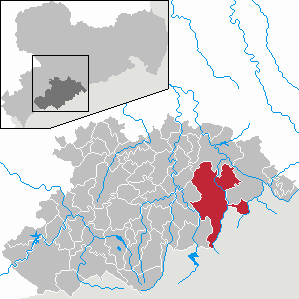
- Location of Marienberg within Erzgebirgskreis district
- Interactive map of Marienberg
- Location within Germany Location within Saxony
- Coordinates: 50°38′N 13°9′E
- Country: Germany
- State: Saxony
- District: Erzgebirgskreis
- Subdivisions: 9

Government
  - Mayor (2022–29): André Heinrich

Area
  - Total: 133.5 km^{2} (51.5 sq mi)
- Elevation: 609 m (1,998 ft)

Population (2025-12-31)
  - Total: 15,948
  - Density: 119.5/km^{2} (309.4/sq mi)
- Time zone: UTC+01:00 (CET)
  - Summer (DST): UTC+02:00 (CEST)
- Postal codes: 09491-09496
- Dialling codes: 03735
- Vehicle registration: ERZ, ANA, ASZ, AU, MAB, MEK, STL, SZB, ZP
- Website: www.marienberg.de

Marienberg (German pronunciation: [maˈʁiːənˌbɛʁk]) is a town in Germany. It was the district capital of the Mittlerer Erzgebirgskreis (Central Ore Mountains district) in the southern part of Saxony, and since August 2008 it has been part of the new district of Erzgebirgskreis. As of 2020, the town had 16,716 inhabitants.

== Location and design ==
The town is situated on a plateau north of the Ore Mountains ridge, at an elevation between 460 and 891 metres above sea level. It is approximately 31 kilometres south of Chemnitz, to which it is connected via the Flöha Valley Railway.

The historical town centre follows a rectangular plan, imitating Italian renaissance. The centre is the market square, a square of 1.7 hectares in area.

Marienberg and Pobershau were merged into the administrative unit (Verwaltungsgemeinschaft) of Marienberg, Pobershau has been incorporated into Marienberg with effect from 1 January 2012.

== Town districts ==
Marienberg's districts are:

- Marienberg
- Ansprung
- Gebirge
- Gelobtland
- Grundau
- Kühnhaide
- Lauta
- Lauterbach
- Niederlauterstein
- Pobershau
- Reitzenhain
- Rittersberg
- Rübenau
- Satzung
- Sorgau
- Zöblitz

== History ==
Map of Marienberg (around 1750)

=== Villages of Gebirge, Gelobtland and Hüttengrund ===
The first documented evidence relating to Marienberg is a mention of the village of Wüstenschletta as Sletyn in 1323. But by 1481 it was being referred as wüste Schlette ("abandoned Schlette"). The owner of the eponymous glassworks in 1486 was Barthol Preußler. On 17 July 1519, silver was first discovered as the entrance to the Hüttengrund by Clemens Schiffel and, on 11 May 1520, the first ore mine (Fundgrube), St. Fabian Sebastian, was leased to Schiffel. The town was founded on 27 April 1521 by Henry the Pious, Duke of Saxony. The town plan was designed by Ulrich Rülein von Calw. Marienberg was granted town rights in 1523 and was given its own mining office (Bergamt) in 1525. A grammar school (Lateinschule) was first mentioned in 1530. The village of Wüstenschletta was subordinated to the jurisdiction of the town in 1533. With the Protestant Reformation reaching the town in 1536/37, Marienberg became an independent parish. Mining reached its peak in 1540. From 1541 to 1566, the town walls were erected. In 1555, there were more than a thousand pits in the Marienberg mining area. The Late Gothic hall church of St. Mary's was built from 1558 to 1564.

On 31 August 1610, the town suffered in a devastating fire in which almost all its 550 houses were destroyed. Following the end of silver mining, the extraction of copper and tin began in 1612. In 1696 troops were first quartered in the town, and from 1753 to 1858, it was a garrison town for the cavalry. Around 1755, Gelobtland (literally: "Promised Land") was mentioned for the first time in the records ("... in the Gelobten Land ..."). In the wake of a fever (Faulfieber) epidemic, an orphanage was founded in 1772, which was expanded into a school (Freischule) in 1805. To improve the food situation of the mining employees a miner's grain store (Bergmagazin) was built from 1806 to 1809 on the recommendation of mining director Friedrich Wilhelm Heinrich von Trebra. In 1810, a school was built in the village of Gebirge. In 1813 Marienberg became a staging post for the allied armies facing Napoleon.

In 1821, the village of Gelobtland was created as a settlement for forest workers. In 1835, the dilapidated town wall was taken down, with the exception of the Zschopau Gate (Zschopauer Tor) and the Red Tower (Roter Turm). In 1842, Marienberg became the seat of the church parish. In 1847, the mining office was closed; that same year a kindergarten was opened in the presence of Friedrich Wilhelm August Fröbel. From 1858 to 1873 Marienberg served as a garrison town for the infantry.

The volunteer fire service was founded in 1862. From 1873 to 1920, there was an NCO school and preschool in Marienberg; in 1874 work on the construction of the barracks was begun. In the same year construction started on a gas works and the installation of gas lanterns. In 1875 Marienberg was given a connection to the railway network with the construction of the Flöha Valley Railway with stations in Marienberg itself, Gebirge, and Gelobtland. In 1882, volunteer fire services were established in Gelobtland and Gebirge. In 1889 the town hospital opened. A water works was built in 1891/1892 and the Central School (Zentralschule, now the gymnasium) was inaugurated in 1893. In 1899 the Rudolf shaft mine closed and, with that, the last mine was gone. In 1910, a power station was built and, in 1913, Marienberg connected to the main electricity supply. In 1914, the church, the Red Tower and the Zschopau Gate were placed under protection by a local by-law. In 1917, work began on the building of the district court. At Gallows Hill (Galgenberg) in 1927 a ski jump was opened. A junior high school and Progymnasium was founded in 1918 and was housed until 1940 within the barracks. With the construction of twelve semi-detached houses from 1933 to 1937, the district of Moosheide was formed.

Between 1924 and 1937, the Marienberg Triangle Race (Marienberger Dreieckrennen) took place ten times. The 17 km route ran from Marienberg, via the Heinzebank and Wolkenstein and back to Marienberg. At that time it was the fastest motorcycle road racing circuit in Germany and has hosted rounds of the German motorcycle road championship.

Towards the end of World War II, 154 concentration camp prisoners from the subcamp of Wille in Tröglitz/Rehmsdorf were murdered during a death march by members of the SS. They had escaped from transport trains at Gelobtland and Reitzenhain stations during enemy strafing attacks between 15 and 17 April 1945 into the surrounding forests, but were recaptured.

From 1874 to 1939, Marienberg was the seat of the eponymous Amtshauptmannschaft which became the county of Marienberg in 1939. The latter was absorbed into the county of Mittlerer Erzgebirgskreis in 1994 and, in 2008, the county of Erzgebirgskreis at which point the town lost its status as the county town. Since 2013, there are no more scheduled passenger trains to Marienberg, while the section of the railway line to Reitzenhain was already closed in 1998.

From 1994 to 2012, several surrounding municipalities were merged with Marienberg. These were in chronological order Lauta (1 January 1994), Niederlauterstein (1 January 1996), Lauterbach (1 January 1998), Hirtstein (1 January 2003), Pobershau (1 January 2012), and the town of Zöblitz (31 December 2012).

== Culture and sights ==
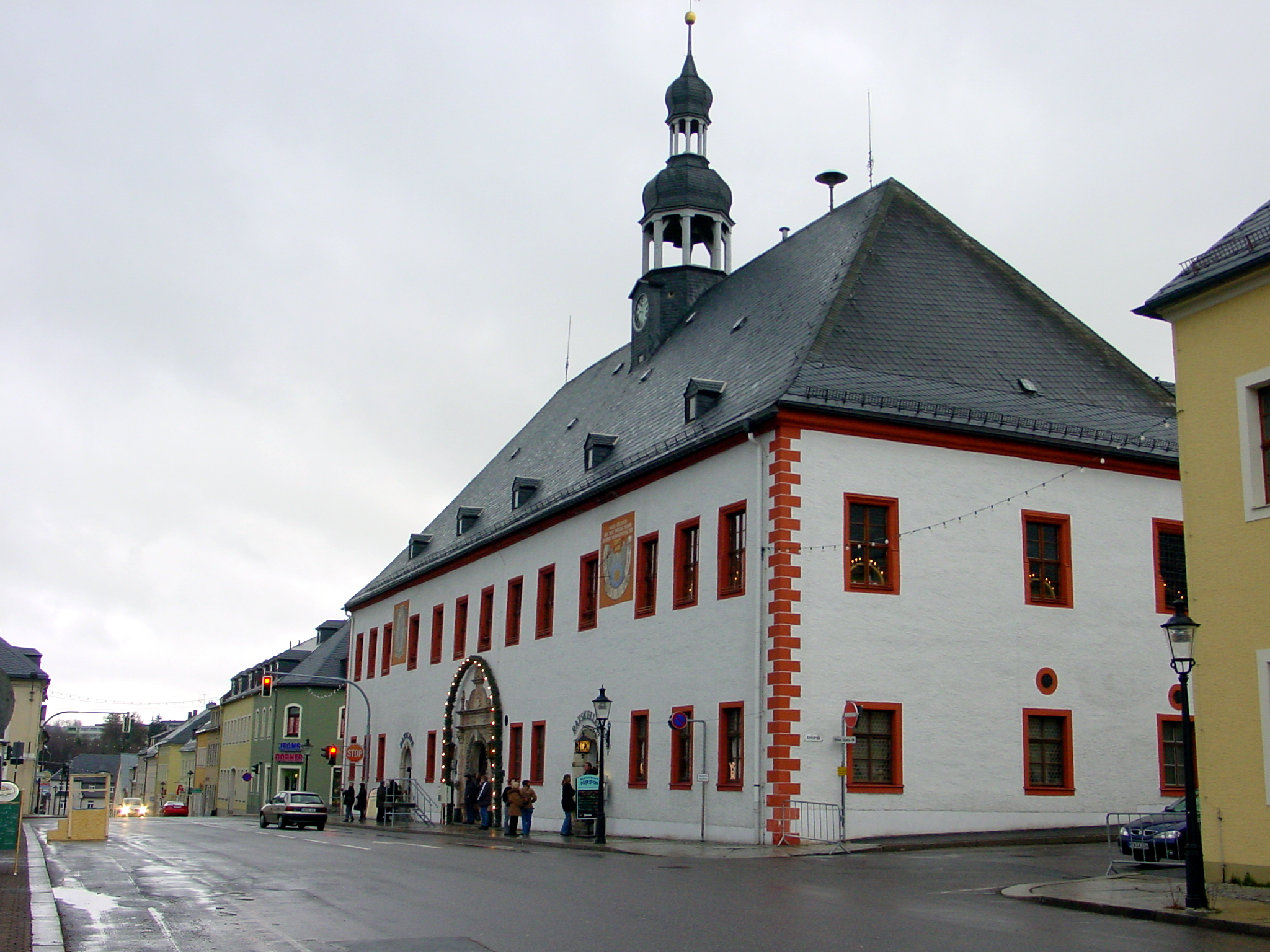
Marienberg town hall

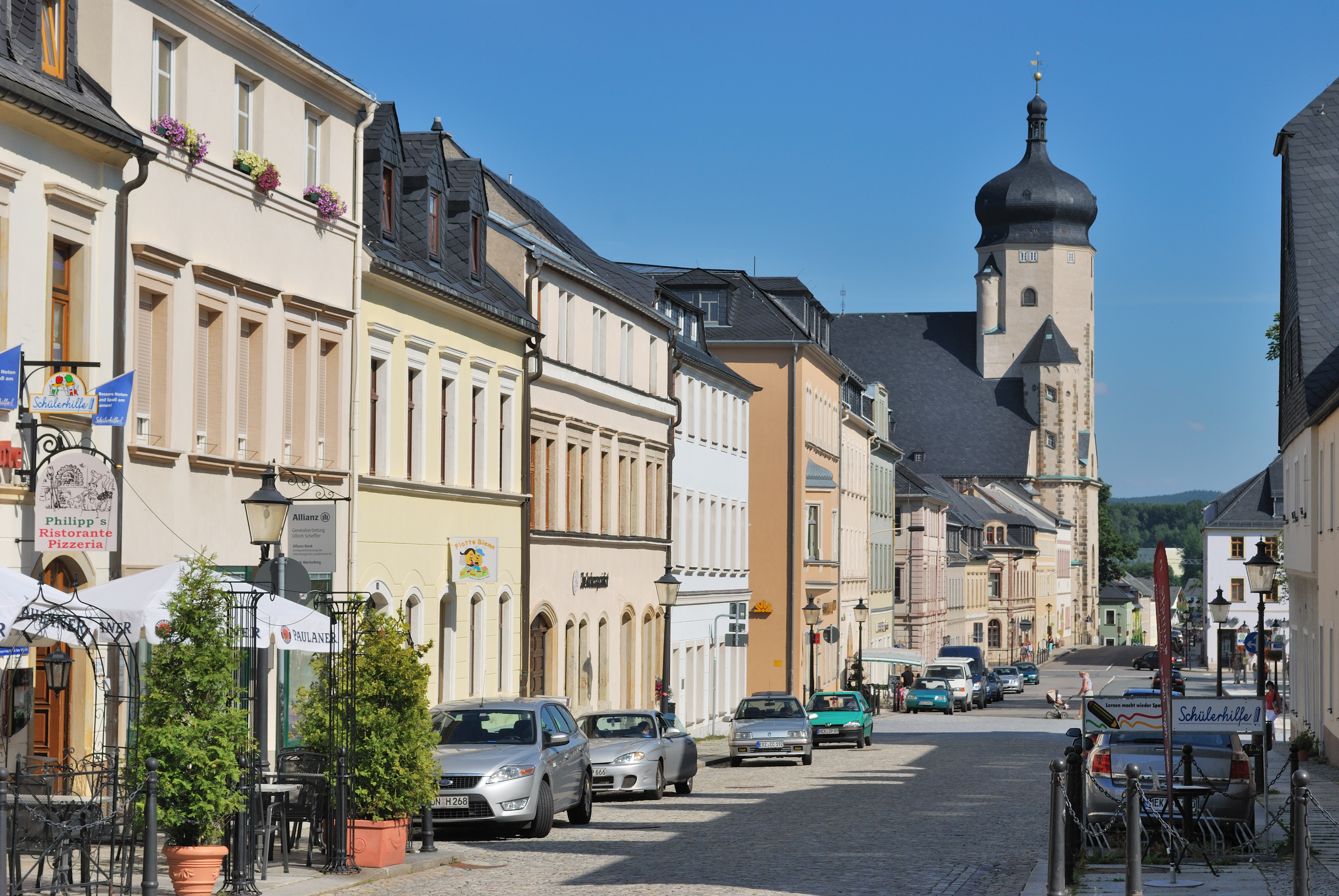
View along Zschopauer Straße to the town church of St. Mary's

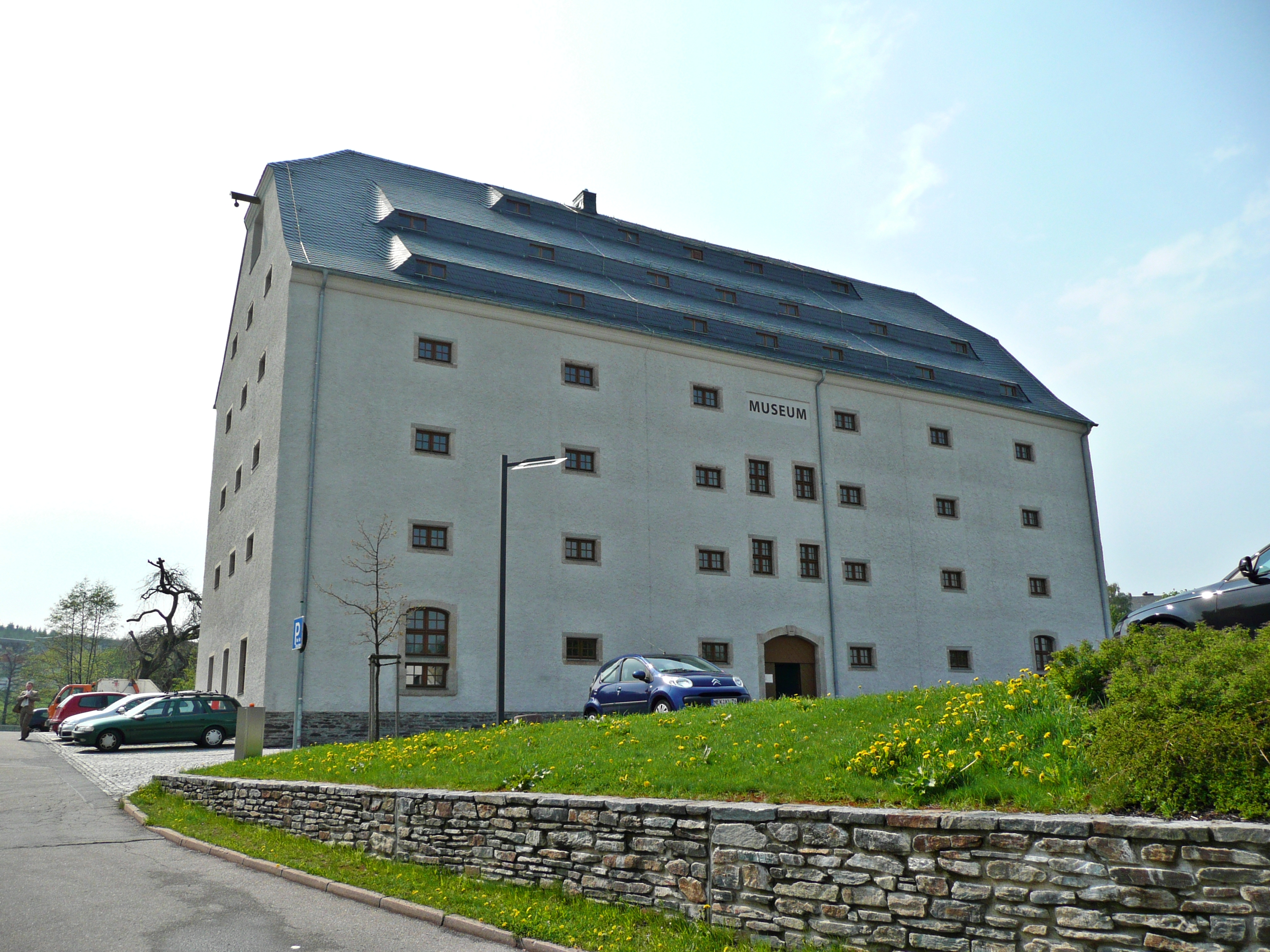
The Marienberg mining store (Bergmagazin), since 2006 a museum for the Saxon-Bohemian Ore Mountains

The historic old town (Altstadt) of Marienberg and the mining country near Lauta is the UNESCO World Heritage Site as a part of the Ore Mountain Mining Region (Montanregion Erzgebirge).

=== Structures ===
- St. Mary's – a Late Gothic hall church
- Town hall built in the Renaissance style
- Red Tower (Roter Turm) – the last of originally 4 corner towers in the town wall
- Zschopau Gate (Zschopauer Tor) – last of originally 5 town gates
- Old Mining Store (Bergmagazin) – built 1806-1809
- Rectangular town plan with a square market place (the Marktplatz)
- Saxon post milestone (Kursächsische Postmeilensäule) from the Zschopau Gate; part of the coat of arms of a Saxon post milestone from the Annaberg Gate in the museum, electoral Saxon full milestone from the High Bridge (Hohe Brücke) as a monument at the Bergmagazin, parts of a Saxon half-milestone walled into the archway of Haus Reiter and two quarter-milestones on the original post road near Reitzenhain and, as the Wettin Oak monument (Wettin Eiche), on Eisenstraße in the Marienberg Forest (Marienberger Forst)
- Royal Saxon milestones as sentinel stones from the Wolkenstein Gate on Wolkensteiner Straße and converted in 1900 to kilometre stones at the old Freiberg Gate and at the Lauterbach junction on the B 171 federal road.

=== Museums ===
- Museum of the Saxon-Bohemian Ore Mountains (Museum sächsisch-böhmisches Erzgebirge) in the Bergmagazin

=== Memorials ===
- Memorial site created in 1952 at Marienberg-Gelobtland station in memory of the murdered concentration camp prisoners
- Memorial plaque for 23 French and 34 Soviet prisoners of the Flöha subcamp of Flossenbürg concentration camp, who were also murdered by the SS in spring 1945
- Memorial site created in 1950 on the B 174 in a wood near Reitzenhain for 218 prisoners executed by SS guards
- Gravesite dug in 1945 at the cemetery for Italian military internees
- Memorial plaque on the staircase of the town hall to the social democrat resistance fighter, Walter Mehnert, who was murdered on 18 October 1943 in the gaol at Brandenburg-Görden (not in Moabit as stated on the plaque)

=== Major events ===
- 26 to 29 July 2001: German Christian Endeavour (Entschieden für Christus) conference (Christian youth conference)
- 1 to 3 September 2006: 15th Day of Saxony in Marienberg

=== Culinary specialities ===
- Lauterbacher Tropfen

== Climate ==
Climate data for Marienberg (1991–2020 normals, extremes 1955–present)
Month	Jan	Feb	Mar	Apr	May	Jun	Jul	Aug	Sep	Oct	Nov	Dec	Year
Record high °C (°F)	15.1 (59.2)	18.8 (65.8)	22.5 (72.5)	28.1 (82.6)	28.7 (83.7)	33.6 (92.5)	34.5 (94.1)	34.5 (94.1)	30.4 (86.7)	25.0 (77.0)	19.5 (67.1)	16.0 (60.8)	34.5 (94.1)
Mean daily maximum °C (°F)	1.5 (34.7)	2.4 (36.3)	5.9 (42.6)	11.7 (53.1)	15.8 (60.4)	19.3 (66.7)	21.3 (70.3)	21.2 (70.2)	16.4 (61.5)	11.4 (52.5)	5.8 (42.4)	2.3 (36.1)	11.5 (52.7)
Daily mean °C (°F)	−1.2 (29.8)	−0.9 (30.4)	2.4 (36.3)	7.2 (45.0)	11.1 (52.0)	14.4 (57.9)	16.3 (61.3)	16.4 (61.5)	12.1 (53.8)	7.8 (46.0)	3.1 (37.6)	0.0 (32.0)	7.6 (45.7)
Mean daily minimum °C (°F)	−3.7 (25.3)	−3.4 (25.9)	−1.1 (30.0)	2.5 (36.5)	6.4 (43.5)	9.7 (49.5)	11.7 (53.1)	11.5 (52.7)	8.0 (46.4)	4.6 (40.3)	0.6 (33.1)	−2.6 (27.3)	3.8 (38.8)
Record low °C (°F)	−25.6 (−14.1)	−35.5 (−31.9)	−20.0 (−4.0)	−12.6 (9.3)	−5.2 (22.6)	−1.8 (28.8)	1.9 (35.4)	0.0 (32.0)	−2.4 (27.7)	−8.4 (16.9)	−15.7 (3.7)	−26.4 (−15.5)	−35.5 (−31.9)
Average precipitation mm (inches)	55 (2.2)	49.1 (1.93)	63.5 (2.50)	48.3 (1.90)	76.8 (3.02)	88.4 (3.48)	100.8 (3.97)	100.7 (3.96)	77.1 (3.04)	69.1 (2.72)	57.9 (2.28)	62.0 (2.44)	865.6 (34.08)
Average precipitation days (≥ 1.0 mm)	17.0	16.0	17.3	13.6	16.3	16.5	16.5	14.9	13.7	15.2	15.6	19.3	197.3
Average snowy days (≥ 1.0 cm)	15.1	16.1	9.0	1.3	0	0	0	0	0	0	3.9	10.5	55.9
Average relative humidity (%)	91.3	87.0	80.8	71.8	73.3	74.6	74.3	75.0	81.4	88.5	92.9	93.0	82.0
Mean monthly sunshine hours	60.7	80.0	119.6	180.1	193.5	201.8	211.1	205.2	155.2	108.7	66.1	57.1	1,689.7
Source 1: World Meteorological Organization
Source 2: DWD (extremes)

== Economy and infrastructure ==
Marienberg is developing its tourism offer; one aspect of that being the Silver Road which runs through the town. A German armoured infantry unit, the Panzergrenadierbataillon 371, is based in the Bundeswehr barracks called Erzgebirgskaserne. The barracks lies on the edge of the old town. In 1996 the unit was given the honorary title the "Marienberg Rifles" (Marienberger Jäger) by the town council.

=== Transport ===
The Flöha Valley Railway, opened in 1875 and now operated by the DB Erzgebirgsbahn, provided a connection to Chemnitz (via Pockau-Lengefeld and Flöha) until 2013. The section between Pockau-Lengefeld and Marienberg is still in use for freight trains, the section between Marienberg and Reitzenhain was closed in 1998 and has been lifted in 2013. It is to be converted into a cycling and hiking path.

The B 174 federal highway from Chemnitz runs through the town towards Reitzenhain (border of Czech Republic), and crosses B 171 from Wolkenstein to Dippoldiswalde near Hüttengrund. The Reitzenhain Pass is the lowest pass in the Ore Mountains and was therefore one of the most important communication links between central Germany and Bohemia in the Middle Ages. State roads connect Marienberg with Annaberg-Buchholz, Pockau, and Lengefeld.

The construction of the ring road, planned for many years, which routes the B 174 east of Marienberg, was started in 2005. It was opened on 29 November 2007 in the presence of Federal Transport Minister, Wolfgang Tiefensee.

Public transport is provided by VMS with scheduled cross-country buses to Annaberg-Buchholz, Brand-Erbisdorf, Chemnitz, Freiberg, Niederschmiedeberg, Olbernhau, Wolkenstein, and Zschopau as well as local buses connecting the various parts of the town.

== Media ==
MEF (Mittel-Erzgebirgs-Fernsehen), a TV station, has been operating since 1989 and aims to provide a broadcasting platform for the community of the county of Mittlerer Erzgebirgkreis.

== Twin towns – sister cities ==
Marienberg is twinned with:

- Bad Marienberg, Germany
- Dorog, Hungary
- Lingen, Germany
- Most, Czech Republic

== Gallery ==
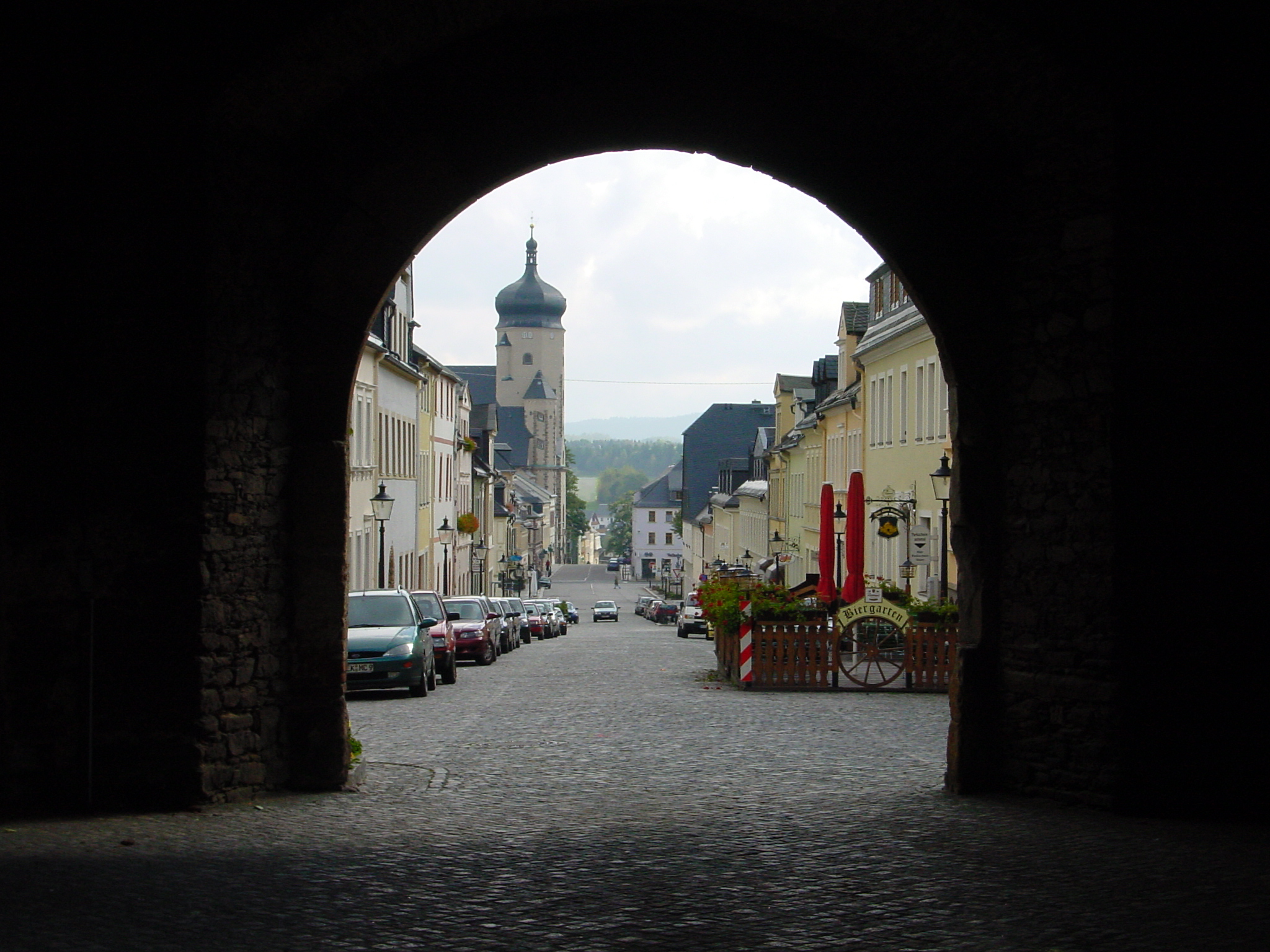
View through the Zschopau Gate to the Church of St. Marien
