= Wolkenstein =

- Town
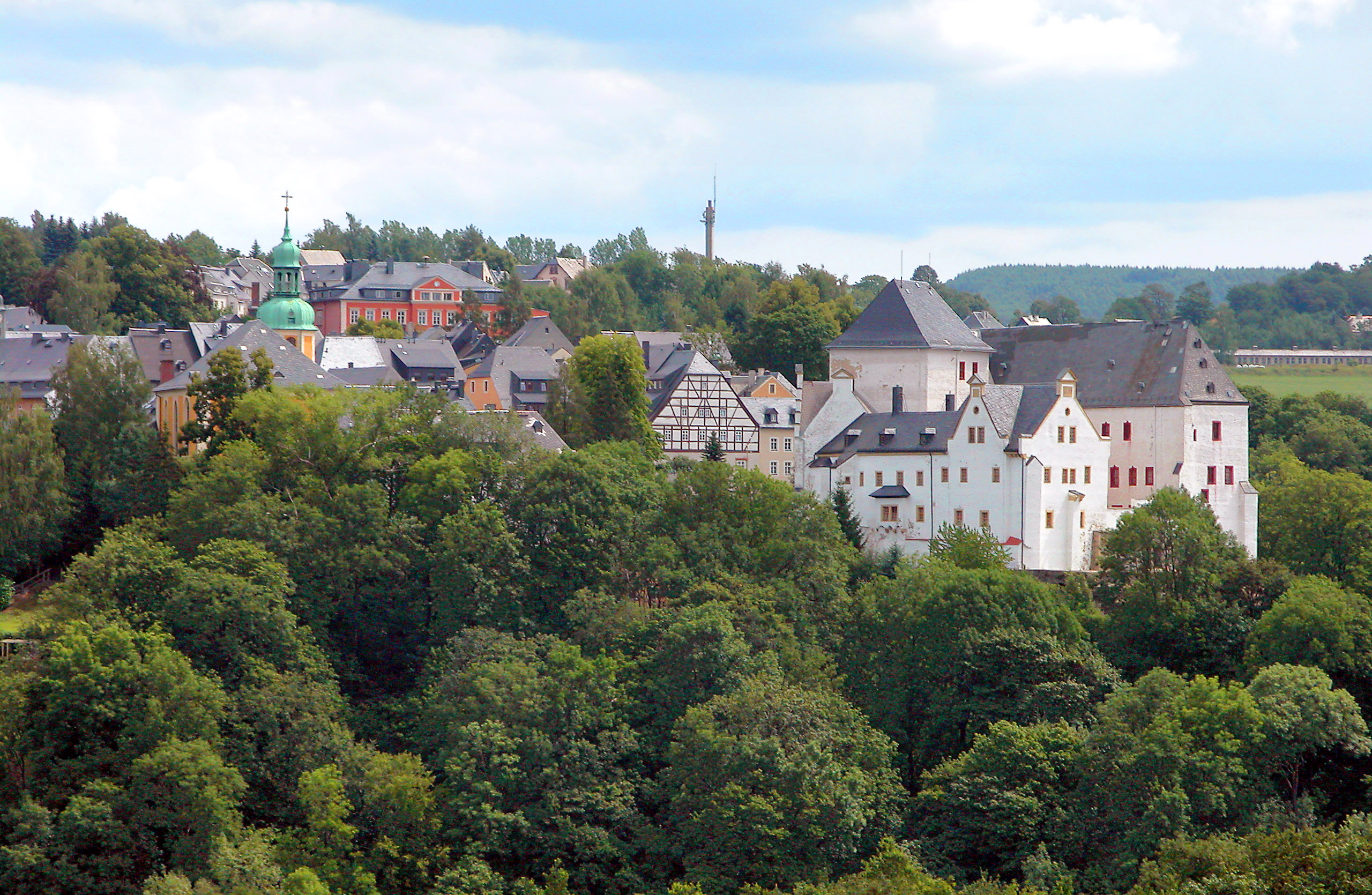
- Wolkenstein

- Coat of arms

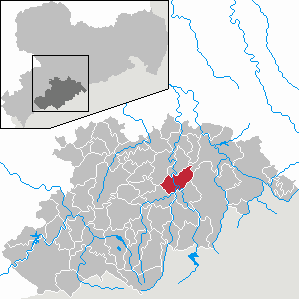
- Location of Wolkenstein within Erzgebirgskreis district
- Interactive map of Wolkenstein
- Location within Germany Location within Saxony
- Coordinates: 50°39′16″N 13°4′29″E
- Country: Germany
- State: Saxony
- District: Erzgebirgskreis
- Subdivisions: 10

Government
  - Mayor (2020–27): Wolfram Liebing (Ind.)

Area
  - Total: 30.51 km^{2} (11.78 sq mi)
- Elevation: 553 m (1,814 ft)

Population (2025-12-31)
  - Total: 3,750
  - Density: 123/km^{2} (318/sq mi)
- Time zone: UTC+01:00 (CET)
  - Summer (DST): UTC+02:00 (CEST)
- Postal codes: 09429
- Dialling codes: 037369
- Vehicle registration: ERZ
- Website: www.stadt-wolkenstein.de

Wolkenstein (German pronunciation: [ˈvɔlkn̩ˌʃtaɪn]) is a town in the district Erzgebirgskreis, in Saxony, Germany. It is situated in the Ore Mountains, on the river Zschopau, 22 km southeast of Chemnitz.

The town is situated on a rocky spur near the confluence of the Zschopau and Preßnitz rivers. Its name is derived from the eponymous castle which is situated ca. 70 m above the river, and whose name signifies a rock that rises into the clouds. Aside from the town itself, Wolkenstein consists of the following subdivisions:

- Drei Rosen
- Falkenbach
- Floßplatz
- Gehringswalde
- Heinzebank
- Hilmersdorf
- Huth
- Kohlau
- Niederau
- Schönbrunn
- Warmbad

Warmbad is a spa town known for its hot spring with a variety of medicinal uses.

== History ==
A Herrschaft Wolkenstein is mentioned in 1262. The town itself was first mentioned in 1293, and was originally called an "oppidum" in 1323. A school was first recorded in 1385. From 1378, Wolkenstein was the seat of the noble family of Waldenburg. After they died out in 1473, it reverted to the House of Wettin. At the same time, mining started again in the area. The Protestant Reformation was introduced in 1536/1537, and Wolkenstein became an independent parish of its own.

A wooden covered bridge across the Zschopau river was built in 1573. Witch-hunts occurred between 1614 and 1680. 67 mines were in operation around 1622. A great fire occurred in 1687, necessitating the rebuilding of the church which was consecrated again in 1689. The wooden bridge was replaced in 1769 by a stone bridge according to plans by Matthäus Daniel Pöppelmann.

A spinning mill was built in 1835 in Floßplatz, which was transformed into a paper mill in 1880. The Zschopay valley railway reached Wolkenstein in 1866. The local volunteer fire department was established in 1876. A new school was built in 1885. The sanitary sewers were completed in 1890, and a high pressure water supply in 1908.

The narrow-gauge Pressnitz valley railway opened in 1892.

Mining ended in 1904.

The first cinema opened in 1919. In 1926, the town took over operation of the health spa in Warmbad. In 1929, Wolkenstein was connected to the gas supply from Annaberg, and the local gas works were closed. In the same year, the new town hall was opened. From 1929 to 1931 a bypass road was built, which necessitated a new bridge across the Zschopau river and the railway.

An aerial night attack from 14 to 15 February 1945 killed six people, and destroyed or damaged more than 200 buildings.

Passenger services on the Pressnitz valley railway ended in 1984, freight services in 1986. The line was subsequently lifted.

On 1 January 1999, the hitherto separate municipalities of Falkenbach, Gehringswalde, Hilmersdorf und Schönbrunn joined Wolkenstein.

The area of the former paper mill was sold in summer 2003, and a supplier for the automotive, medical, and electrical industry started production of turned parts from there.

== Number of inhabitants ==
1982 bis 1988

- 1982: 4.843
- 1985: 4.873
- 1988: 4.976

1989 bis 1995

- 1989: 4.864
- 1992: 4.635
- 1995: 4.617

1996 bis 2002

- 1996: 4.528
- 1999: 4.400
- 2000: 4.358

2003 bis 2012

- 2003: 4.335
- 2007: 4.217
- 2012: 4.001

ab 2013

- 2013: 3.941

Source: Statistical Office of Saxony

== People who are connected to the place ==
- Kaspar Eberhard (1523-1575), Lutheran theologian and pedagogue
