= Schlettenbach =

River in Saxony, Germany

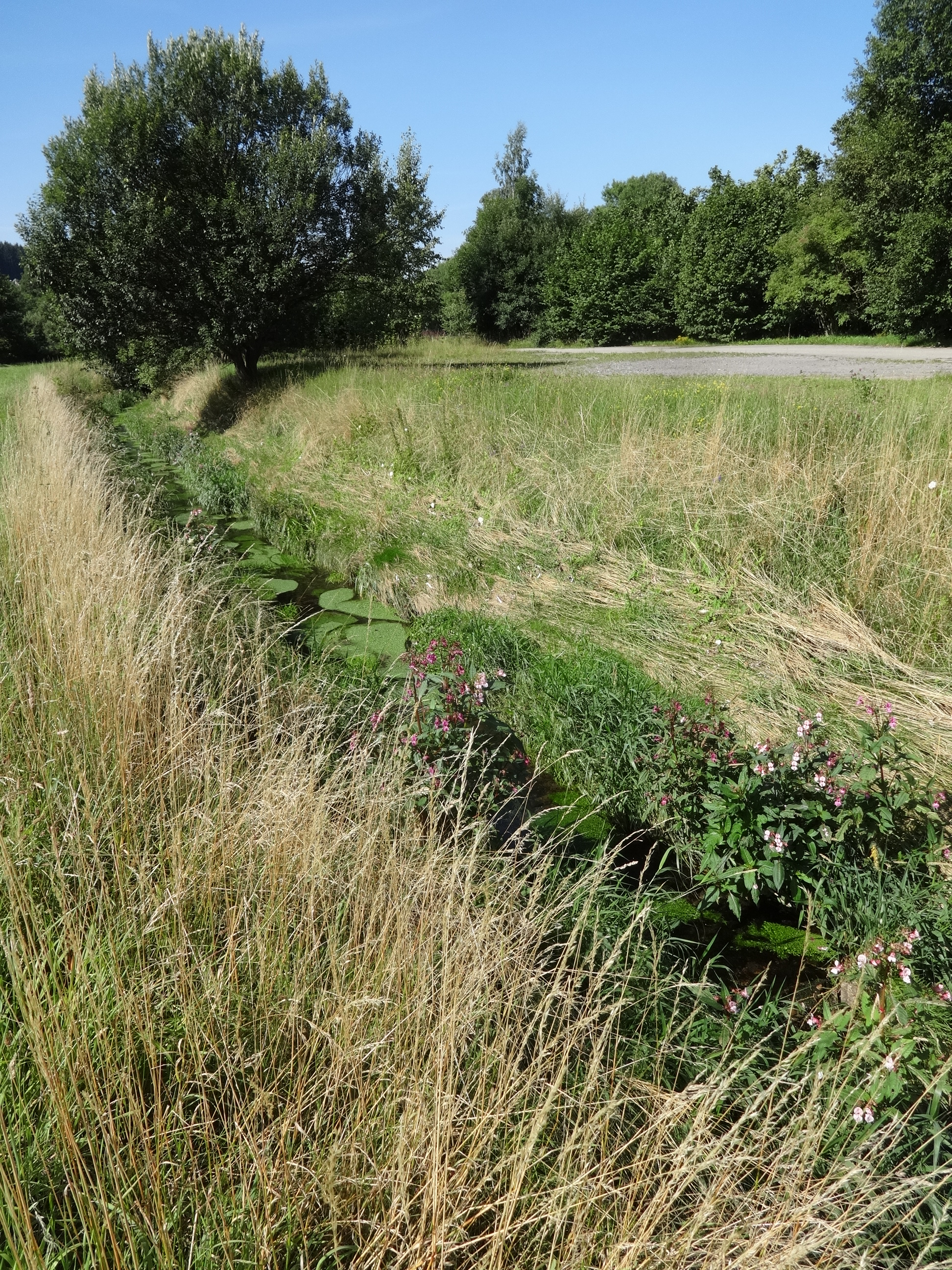
- The Schlettenbach at Dörfel, near Marienberg

Location
- Country: Germany
- State: Saxony

Physical characteristics
- Source
  - location: Marienberg plateau, Ore Mountains
  - elevation: 640 m (2,100 ft)
- Mouth
  - location: Red Pockau near Pobershau
  - coordinates: 50.6521°N 13.2040°E
- Length: 7.12 km (4.42 mi)
- Basin size: 21.9 km^{2} (8.5 sq mi)

Basin features
- Progression: Red Pockau→ Black Pockau→ Flöha→ Zschopau→ Freiberger Mulde→ Mulde→ Elbe→ North Sea
- Tributaries
  - left: Moosbach, Lautenbach, Krötenbach
  - right: Seilerbach

The Schlettenbach is a river in Saxony, Germany, 7.12 kilometres (4.42 mi) long. Rising on the Marienberg plateau in the Ore Mountains, it flows through Marienberg and joins the Red Pockau near Pobershau. Heavy rain in July 1999 caused it to flood destructively in the Hüttengrund district.

== Course ==
The Schlettenbach rises at about 640 metres (2,100 ft) above sea level on the western edge of the Marienberg plateau, south of the road to Großrückerswalde. It flows through Marienberg and the Hüttengrund district to its east, draining the western part of the plateau, and joins the Red Pockau at the northern edge of Pobershau. Its drainage basin covers 21.9 square kilometres (8.5 sq mi).

== Tributaries ==
The tributaries of the Schlettenbach are:

- Seilerbach, with the Alte Flöße (right)
- Moosbach (left)
- Lautenbach (left)
- Krötenbach (left)

== Flooding ==
Because its drainage basin is large relative to its short length, the Schlettenbach can rise rapidly in heavy rain. During a storm on 5–6 July 1999, nearly 150 millimetres (5.9 in) of rain fell around Marienberg in under two hours, turning the river into a torrent that caused severe damage in the Hüttengrund district and washed out sections of the Reitzenhain–Flöha railway.

== See also ==
- List of rivers of Saxony
