= Medvědí skála =

Mountain in the Czech Republic

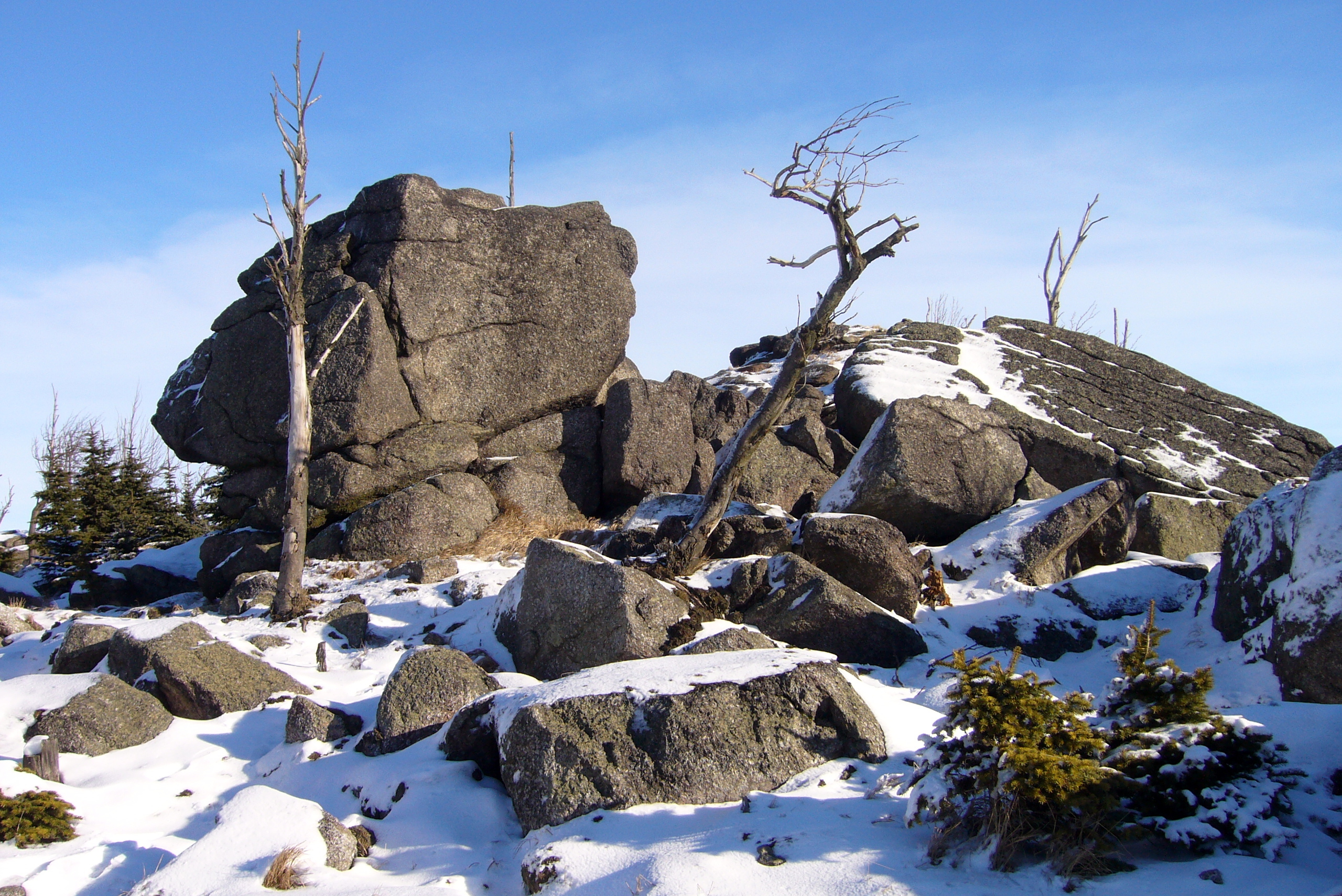
- Summit of the Medvědí skála

Highest point
- Elevation: 924 m (3,031 ft)
- Prominence: 135 m (443 ft)
- Isolation: 13.3 km (8.3 mi)
- Coordinates: 50°34′02″N 13°27′53″E

Geography
- Location within Czech Republic
- Location: Nová Ves v Horách, Czech Republic
- Parent range: Ore Mountains

The Medvědí skála (German: Bärenstein, also Bernsteinberg) is a 924 m high mountain in the Ore Mountains in the Czech Republic.

== Location and surroundings ==
The mountain lies 3 kilometres southwest of Mikulovice within the municipality of Nová Ves v Horách and, together with the Lesenská pláň forms the largest group of mountains in the central part of the Ore Mountains. The mountains lie between the Saxon village of Olbernhau and the Czech town of Litvínov and are surrounded by the valleys of the Natzschung, Schweinitz and the Flöha.

The Bernsteinberg was Station No. 14 in the 1860s, a primary station of the Royal Saxon Survey (Königlich-Sächsische Triangulation).

The Medvědí skála is difficult to climb because it is partly surrounded by mountain bogs and there are no established paths.
