= Große Lößnitz =

River in Germany

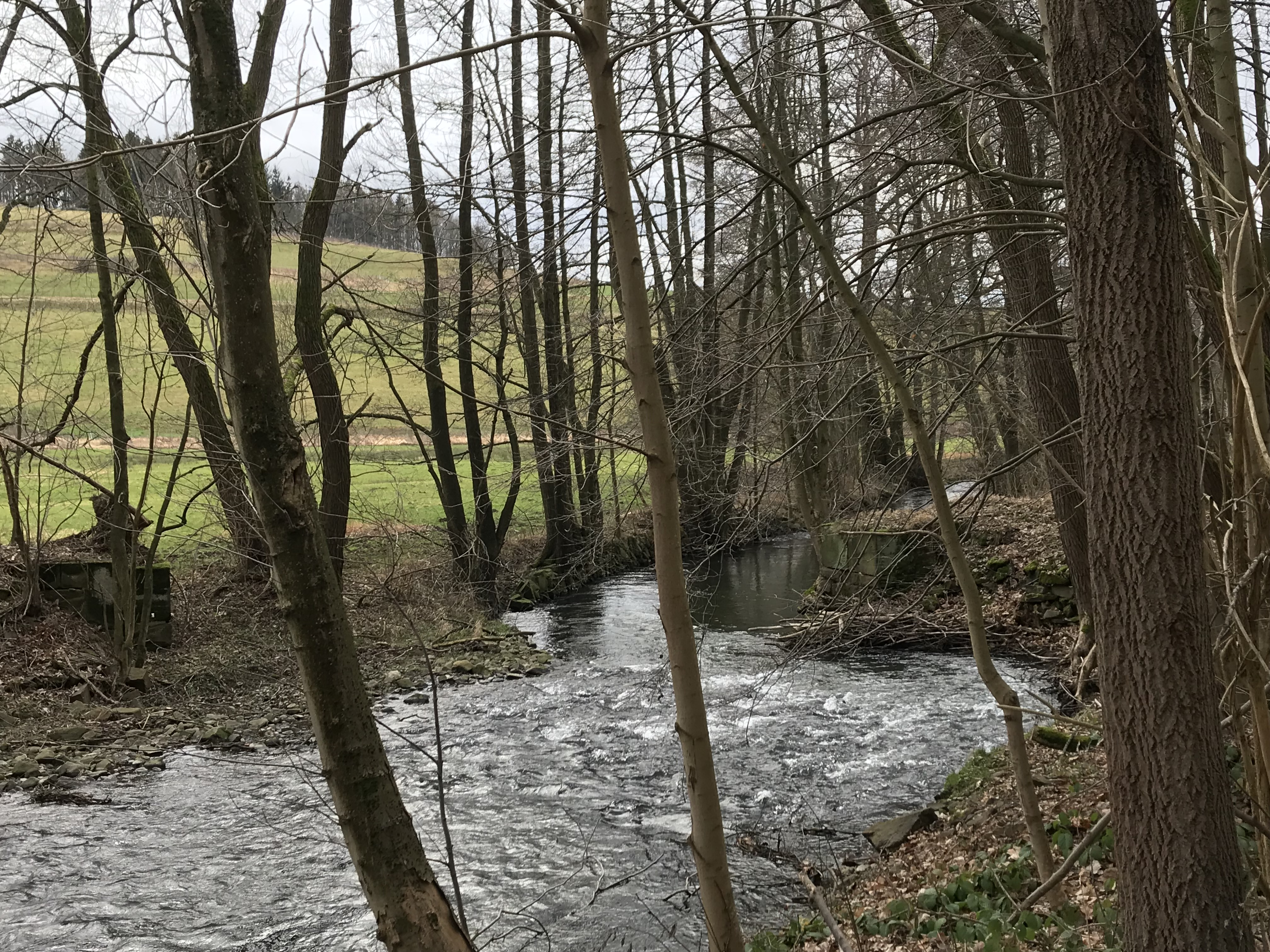
- Große Lößnitz (2018)

Location
- Location: Saxony, Germany

Physical characteristics
- Source
  - location: source region: near Großwaltersdorf
  - elevation: ca. 540 m above sea level (NN)
- Mouth
  - location: between Metzdorf and Hetzdorf into the Flöha
  - coordinates: 50°49′55″N 13°08′09″E
- Length: 17.8 km
- Basin size: 65.3 km²

Basin features
- Progression: Flöha → Zschopau → Freiberger Mulde → Mulde → Elbe → North Sea
- River system: Elbe
- Landmarks: Villages: Eppendorf
- Tributaries
  - right: Kleine Lößnitz

The Große Lößnitz is a river in Saxony, Germany. It is a right tributary of the Flöha, which it joins near Oederan. It is 17.8 kilometres long and the second longest tributary of the Flöha.

It rises near Großwaltersdorf at about 540 metres above sea level and runs in a west-nordwesterly direction. From below Eppendorf to its mouth the waterbody has cut a roughly 100 metre deep valley into the terrain. Between the Lößnitz valley and the former halt of Metzdorf on the Hetzdorf and Großwaltersdorf narrow gauge railway, the river meanders markedly in a relatively wide and visibly waterlogged river meadow. The adjoining section to the mouth, on the other hand has a significantly steeper gradient and only a narrow floodplain.

Roughly 400 metres above its confluence with the Flöha and southwest of Görbersdorf, the Kleine Lößnitz empties into it from the right at 465 metres above sea level .

== See also ==
- List of rivers of Saxony
