= Red Pockau =

River in Germany

Rote Pockau
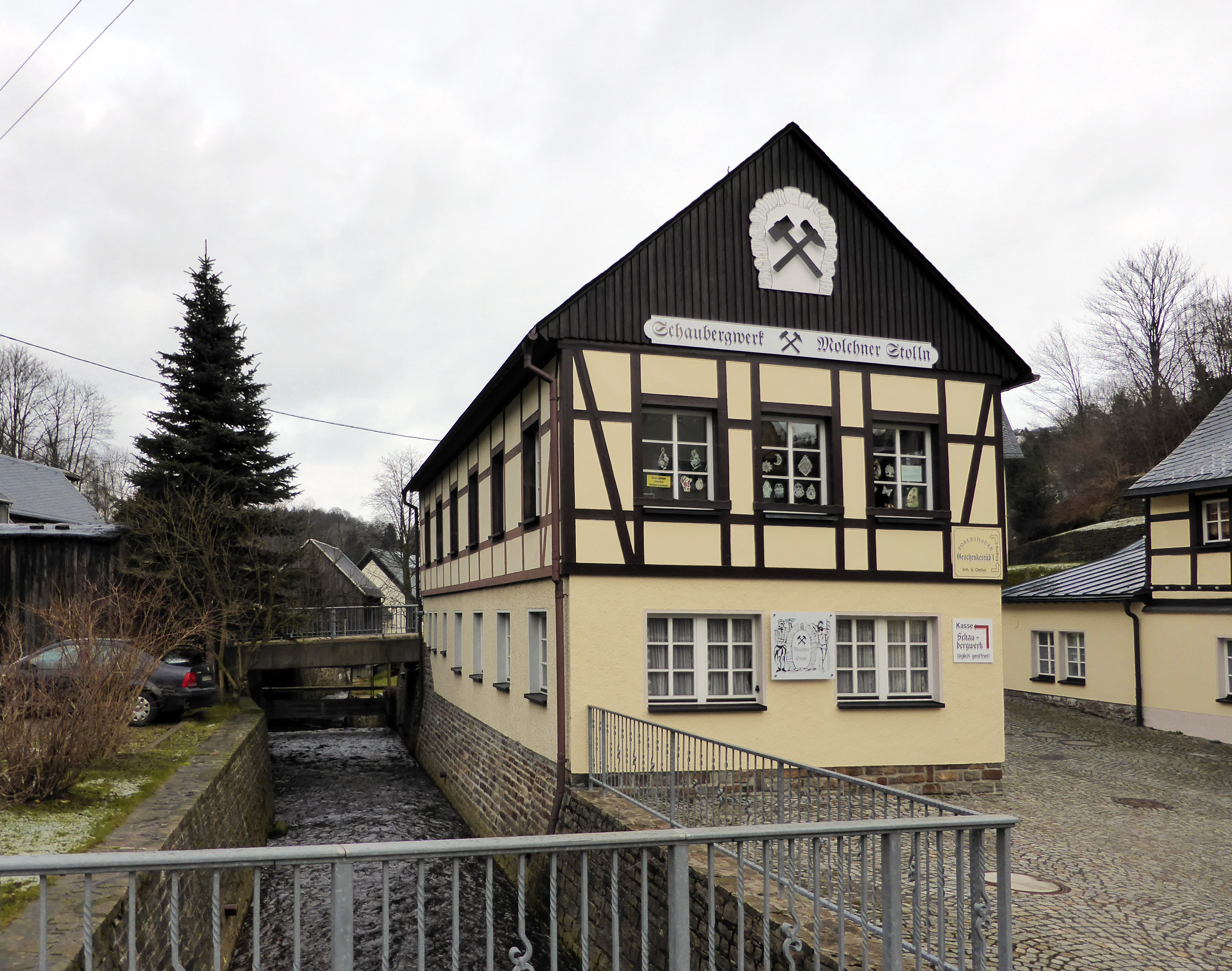
- The Red Pockau at the show mine of the Molchner Stolln in Pobershau

Location
- Country: Germany
- State: Saxony
- Reference no.: DE: 5426864

Physical characteristics
- Source
  - location: Source region: c. 2 km (1.2 mi) northwest of Kühnhaide
  - coordinates: 50°35′10″N 13°11′43″E
  - elevation: ca. 771 m above sea level (NN)
- Mouth
  - location: near Pobershau into the Black Pockau
  - coordinates: 50°39′25.93″N 13°12′39.89″E
  - elevation: c. 490 m above sea level (NN)
- Length: 10 km (6.2 mi)
- Basin size: 46.6 km^{2} (18.0 sq mi)
- Discharge
  - average: 0.590 m^{3}/s (20.8 cu ft/s)

Basin features
- Progression: Black Pockau→ Flöha→ Zschopau→ Freiberger Mulde→ Mulde→ Elbe→ North Sea
- Landmarks: Villages: Pobershau
- Tributaries
  - left: Schlettenbach

The Red Pockau (German: Rote Pockau) is a 10-kilometre-long (6.2 mi) left tributary of the Black Pockau in the Ore Mountains.

== Course ==
It rises at a height of about 760 m above sea level (NN), about two kilometres (1.2 mi) northwest of the village of Kühnhaide in the municipality of Marienberg. Between the Marienberg and the roughly 100 metre higher Kühnhaide plateaux the Red Pockau has cut deeply into the terrain. Below the ponds called the Rätzteiche, there is a steep-sided V-shaped valley that becomes more canyon-like below Pobershau. At the northern exit of Pobershau it collects the Schlettenbach stream. A few hundred metres further on the Red Pockau discharges into the Black Pockau at a height of about 490 m above sea level (NN).

== Tributaries ==
- Nasser Brückenbach (r)
- Weißwasser (l)
  - Rotepfützenbach (l)
- Mothäuser Bach (r)
- Wildsbergbach (r)
- Bärengrundbach (l)
- Goldkronenbach (r)
- Schlettenbach (l)

== Name ==
In former times, the Red Pockau used to be called "the Little Bockau or the Red Water" (die kleine Bockau oder das rothe Wasser) and the Black Pockau (Schwarze Pockau) the "Great Bockau" (Große Bockau) or "the Black Water" (das schwarze Wasser).

== See also ==
- List of rivers of Saxony
