= Nová Ves v Horách =

- Municipality
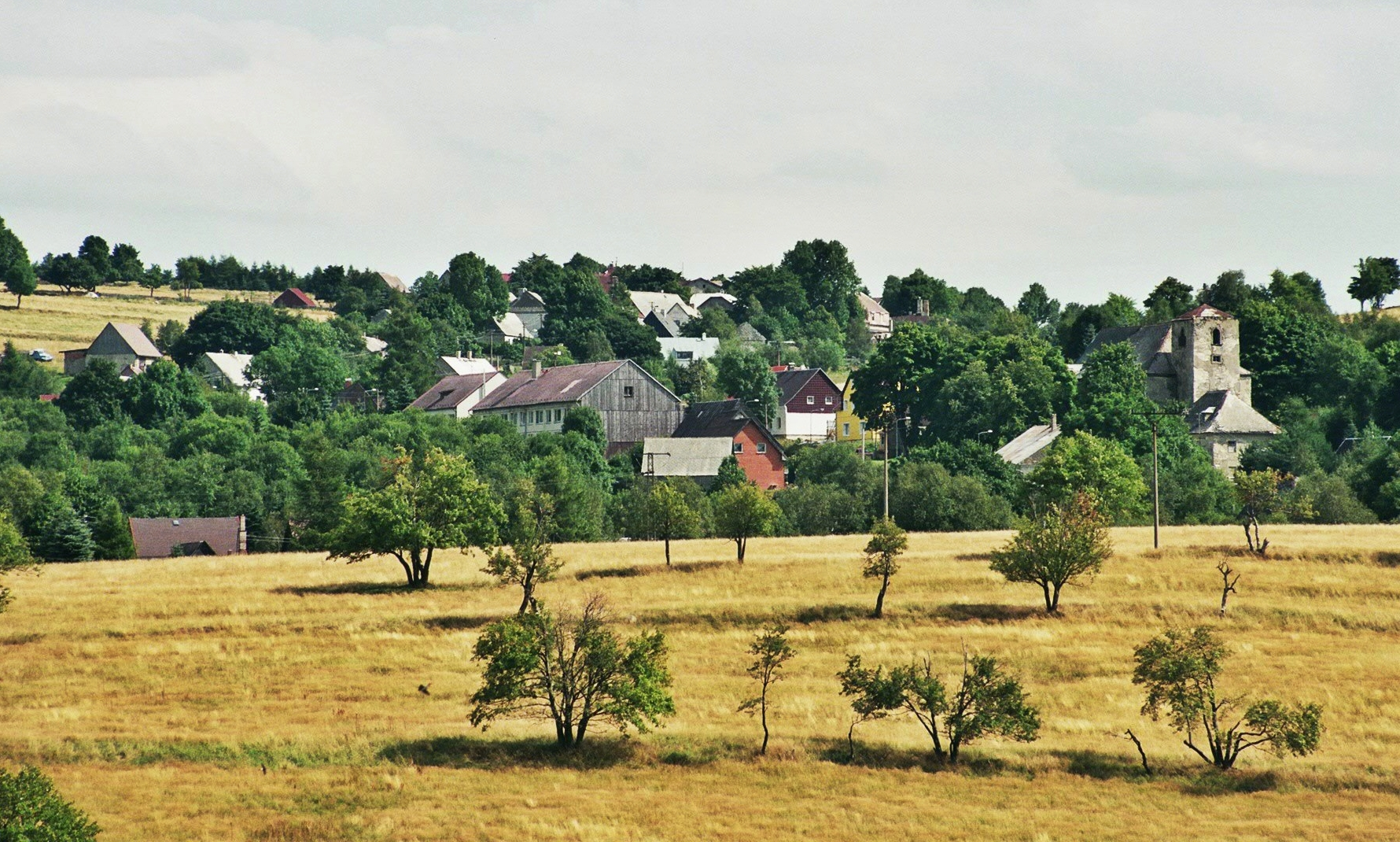
- General view

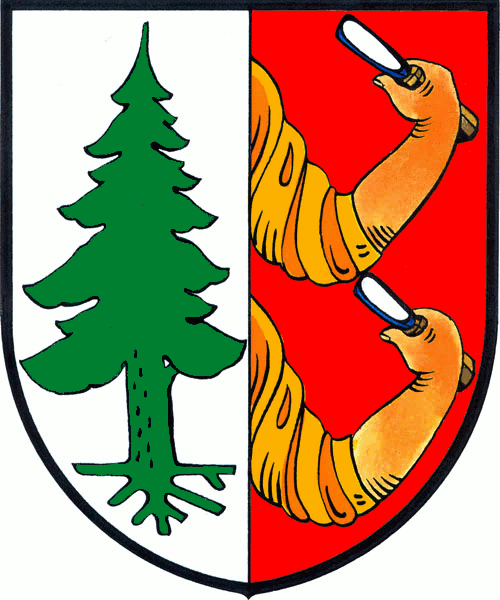
- Flag Coat of arms

- Location in the Czech Republic
- Coordinates: 50°35′41″N 13°28′57″E
- Country: Czech Republic
- Region: Ústí nad Labem
- District: Most
- First mentioned: 1564

Area
  - Total: 26.24 km^{2} (10.13 sq mi)
- Elevation: 685 m (2,247 ft)

Population (2026-01-01)
  - Total: 486
  - Density: 18.5/km^{2} (48.0/sq mi)
- Time zone: UTC+1 (CET)
  - Summer (DST): UTC+2 (CEST)
- Postal code: 435 45
- Website: www.novavesvhorach.cz

Nová Ves v Horách (German: Gebirgsneudorf) is a municipality and village in Most District in the Ústí nad Labem Region of the Czech Republic. It has about 500 inhabitants. It lies in the Ore Mountains.

== Administrative division ==
Nová Ves v Horách consists of four municipal parts (in brackets population according to the 2021 census):

- Nová Ves v Horách (315)
- Lesná (1)
- Mikulovice (101)
- Mníšek (28)

== Etymology ==
The name literally means 'new village in the mountains'.

== Geography ==
Nová Ves v Horách is located about 14 kilometres (9 mi) northwest of Most and 39 km (24 mi) west of Ústí nad Labem. It lies on the Czech–German border and is adjacent to the municipality of Deutschneudorf. The entire Czech–German border is formed here by the Schweinitz/Svídnice Stream. The municipality lies in the Ore Mountains. The highest point is the mountain Medvědí skála at 924 m (3,031 ft) above sea level.

=== Climate ===
Nová Ves v Horách's climate is classified as humid continental climate (Köppen Dfb; Trewartha: Dclo). Among them, the annual average temperature is 6.5 °C (43.7 °F), the hottest month in July is 16.0 °C (60.8 °F), and the coldest month is −2.5 °C (27.5 °F) in January. The annual precipitation is 795.1 millimetres (31.30 in), of which June is the wettest with 93.9 millimetres (3.70 in), while April is the driest with only 41.0 millimetres (1.61 in). The extreme temperature throughout the year ranged from −24.5 °C (−12.1 °F) on 15 January 1963 to 34.1 °C (93.4 °F) on 13 August 2003.

Climate data for Nová Ves v Horách, 1991–2020 normals, extremes 1961–present
Month	Jan	Feb	Mar	Apr	May	Jun	Jul	Aug	Sep	Oct	Nov	Dec	Year
Record high °C (°F)	14.0 (57.2)	16.9 (62.4)	19.7 (67.5)	26.0 (78.8)	28.1 (82.6)	33.0 (91.4)	32.5 (90.5)	34.1 (93.4)	28.6 (83.5)	24.5 (76.1)	17.0 (62.6)	15.5 (59.9)	34.1 (93.4)
Mean daily maximum °C (°F)	−0.1 (31.8)	1.0 (33.8)	5.0 (41.0)	11.2 (52.2)	15.6 (60.1)	18.9 (66.0)	21.2 (70.2)	21.0 (69.8)	15.8 (60.4)	9.9 (49.8)	4.0 (39.2)	0.6 (33.1)	10.3 (50.5)
Daily mean °C (°F)	−2.5 (27.5)	−1.7 (28.9)	1.5 (34.7)	6.6 (43.9)	10.7 (51.3)	13.9 (57.0)	16.0 (60.8)	15.8 (60.4)	11.4 (52.5)	6.6 (43.9)	1.7 (35.1)	−1.6 (29.1)	6.5 (43.7)
Mean daily minimum °C (°F)	−5.0 (23.0)	−4.4 (24.1)	−1.6 (29.1)	2.4 (36.3)	6.2 (43.2)	9.4 (48.9)	11.5 (52.7)	11.5 (52.7)	7.8 (46.0)	3.7 (38.7)	−0.4 (31.3)	−3.9 (25.0)	3.1 (37.6)
Record low °C (°F)	−24.5 (−12.1)	−21.6 (−6.9)	−18.4 (−1.1)	−10.5 (13.1)	−4.2 (24.4)	−1.3 (29.7)	0.8 (33.4)	2.3 (36.1)	−2.0 (28.4)	−8.2 (17.2)	−14.1 (6.6)	−20.4 (−4.7)	−24.5 (−12.1)
Average precipitation mm (inches)	59.9 (2.36)	51.5 (2.03)	59.1 (2.33)	41.0 (1.61)	70.3 (2.77)	93.9 (3.70)	82.9 (3.26)	91.4 (3.60)	69.5 (2.74)	58.7 (2.31)	55.9 (2.20)	61.0 (2.40)	795.1 (31.30)
Average snowfall cm (inches)	43.7 (17.2)	38.2 (15.0)	31.2 (12.3)	7.4 (2.9)	0.4 (0.2)	0.0 (0.0)	0.0 (0.0)	0.0 (0.0)	0.2 (0.1)	3.0 (1.2)	22.6 (8.9)	40.1 (15.8)	186.7 (73.5)
Average relative humidity (%)	89.4	86.1	81.3	72.1	74.1	76.1	73.9	74.3	80.5	86.0	91.3	90.8	81.3
Mean monthly sunshine hours	45.1	76.1	114.7	165.5	195.3	202.1	216.3	210.9	148.2	96.3	39.2	35.9	1,545.7
Source: Czech Hydrometeorological Institute

== History ==
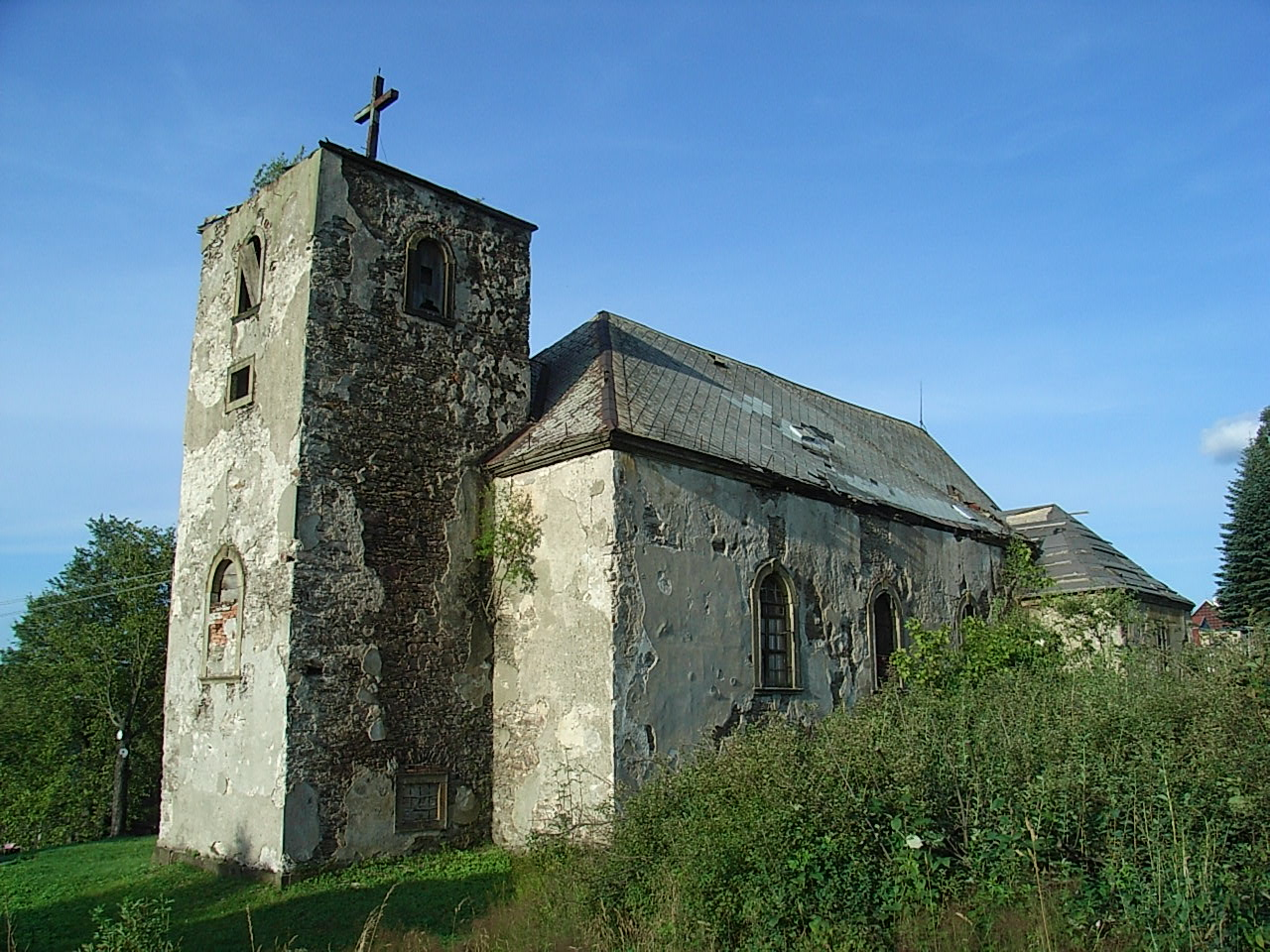
Church of Saint Michael the Archangel

The first written mention of Nová Ves v Horách is from 1564. At this time, settlements were being established in the Ore Mountains for silver and copper mining. In 1595, Emperor Rudolf II sold Nová Ves v Horách to the city of Most. In 1690, the village was acquired by the Lobkowicz family. From 1690 until the establishment of an independent municipality, the Nová Ves v Horách was part of the Novosedly – Jezeří estate.

== Demographics ==
Historical population

Year	Pop.	±%
1869	2,000	—
1880	2,164	+8.2%
1890	2,050	−5.3%
1900	2,177	+6.2%
1910	2,268	+4.2%

Year	Pop.	±%
1921	2,081	−8.2%
1930	2,107	+1.2%
1950	635	−69.9%
1961	647	+1.9%
1970	583	−9.9%

Year	Pop.	±%
1980	509	−12.7%
1991	374	−26.5%
2001	418	+11.8%
2011	462	+10.5%
2021	445	−3.7%

Source: Censuses

== Transport ==
There are no railways or major roads passing through the municipality. On the Czech–German border are two road border crossings: Nová Ves v Horách / Deutschneudorf and Mníšek / Deutscheinsiedel.

== Sights ==
The main landmark of Nová Ves v Horách is the Church of Saint Michael the Archangel. It was built in the Baroque style in 1780–1784. It is a simple rural church with a massive tower.
