= Czech Republic–Germany border =

International border

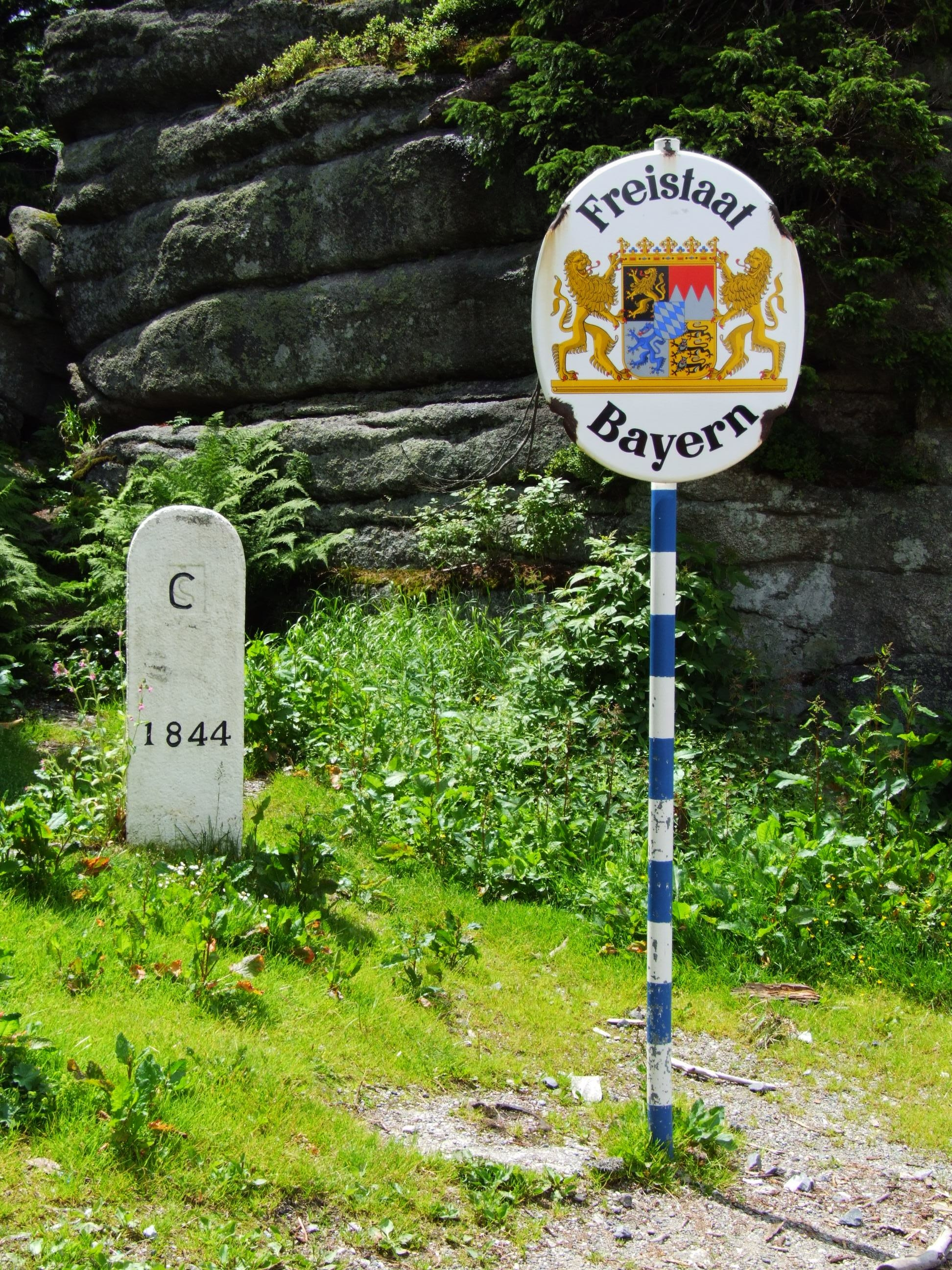
- Border stone on Mt. Třístoličník/Dreisesselberg

Characteristics
- Entities: Czech Republic Germany
- Length: 815 km (506 mi)

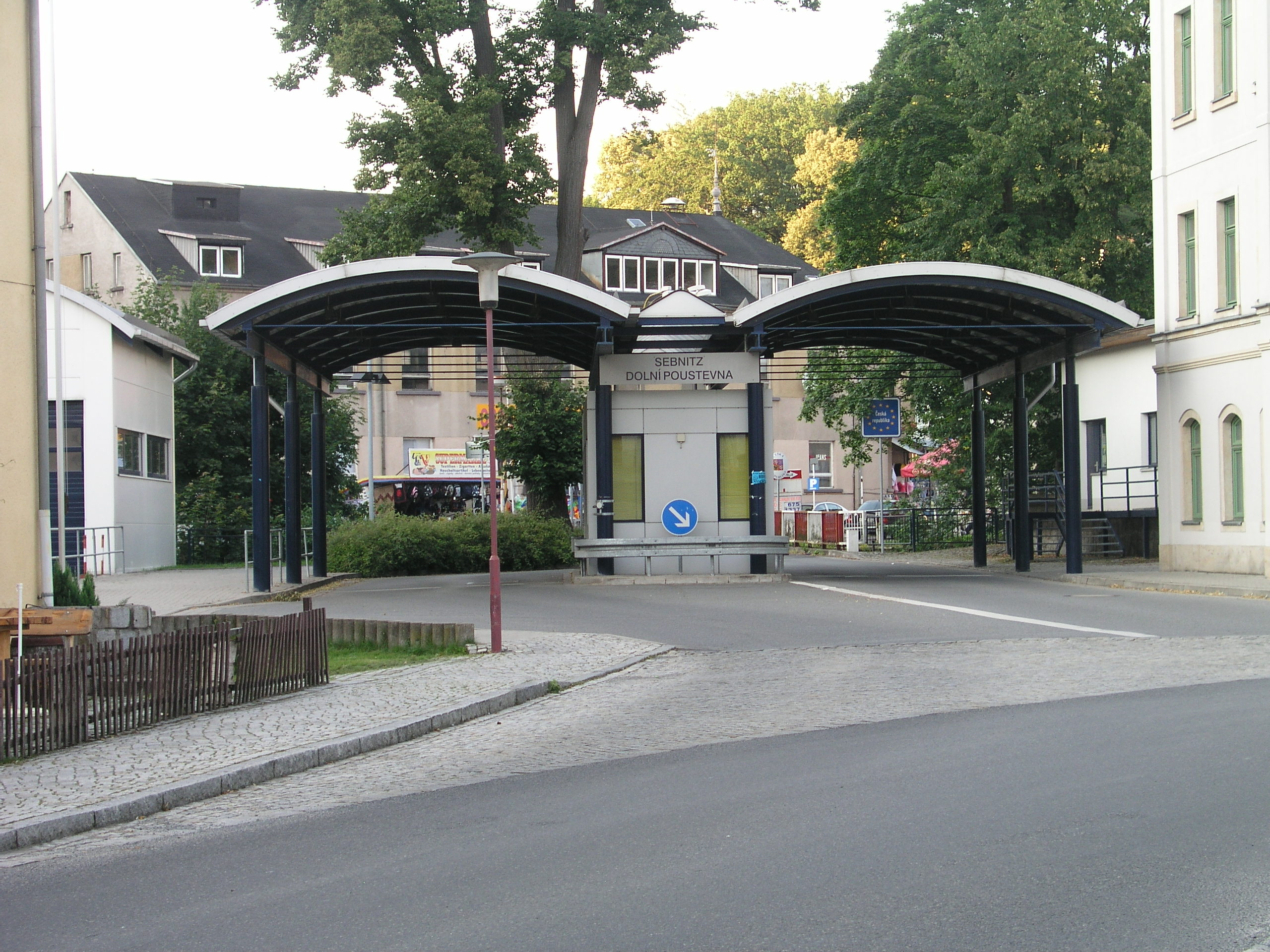
Border crossing point between Sebnitz, Germany (foreground) and Dolní Poustevna, Czech Republic (background)

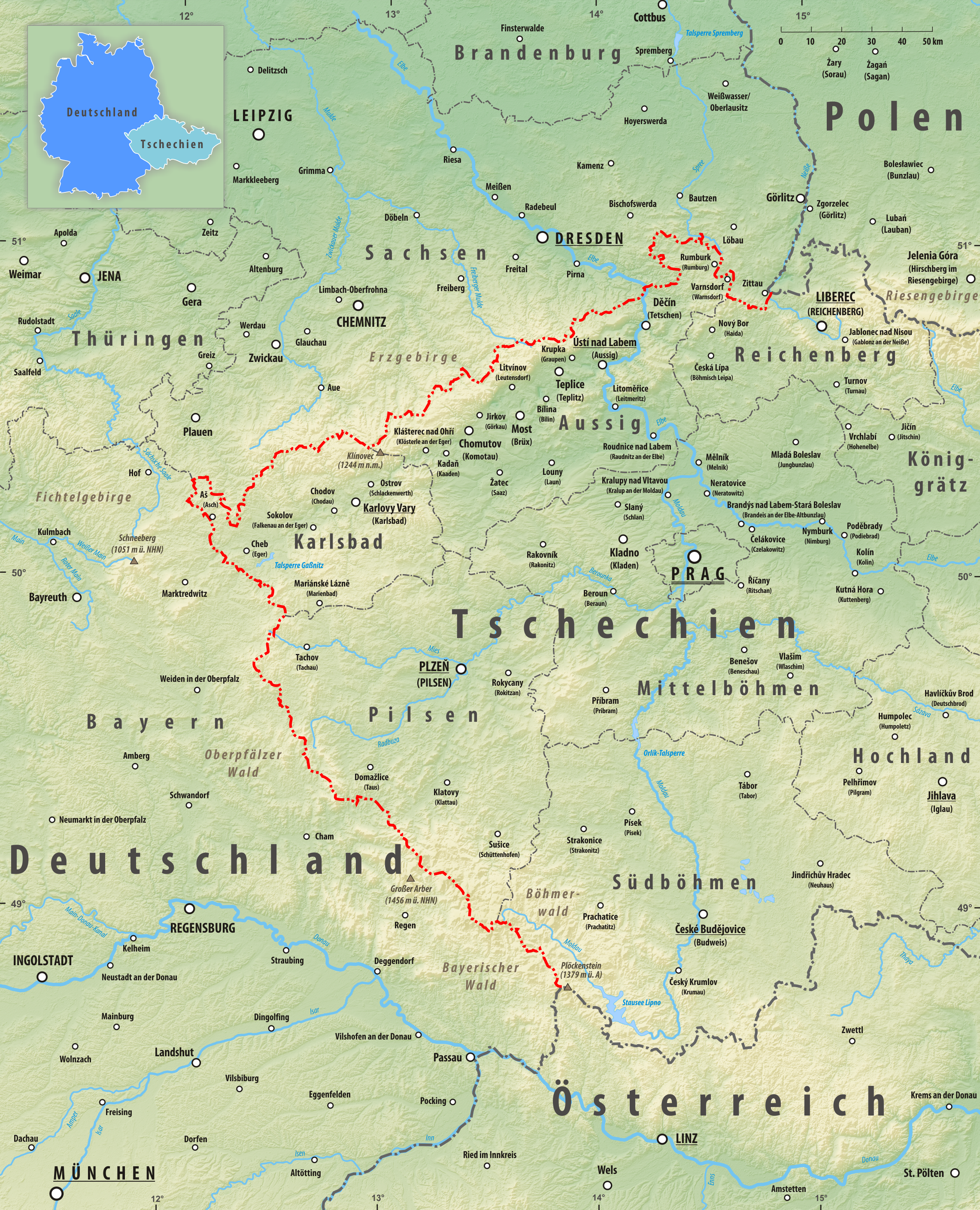
Czech–German border (red)

The border between the Czech Republic and Germany (Czech: Česko-německá státní hranice; German: Grenze zwischen Deutschland und Tschechien) is the international border between the Czech Republic and Germany. It forms a 815 kilometres (506 mi) arc extending from the tripoint with Austria at the south to the tripoint with Poland at the north.

== Rivers ==
Several rivers cross this border, or form portions of it. These include:

- Chamb (Czech: Kouba)
- Pfreimd (Czech: Kateřinský potok)
- Wondreb (Czech: Odrava)
- Ohře (German: Eger)
- Mže (German: Mies)
- White Elster (Czech: Bílý Halštrov)
- Natzschung (Czech: Načetinský potok)
- Flöha (Czech: Flájský potok)
- Wild Weißeritz (Czech: Divoká Bystřice)
- Müglitz (Czech: Mohelnice)
- Biela (Czech: Bělá)
- Elbe (Czech: Labe)
- Spree (Czech: Spréva)
- Mandau (Czech: Mandava)
- Lusatian Neisse (Czech: Lužická Nisa, German: Lausitzer Neiße)

== History ==
The border comes from the border of the Lands of the Bohemian Crown, which later became the border between the German Empire and the Austrian Empire.

In the period 1945–1990, the West German–Czechoslovak border formed part of the Iron Curtain and was heavily fenced and strictly guarded.

The Czech Republic joined the Schengen Area in 2007. This meant that all passport checks were removed along the border in December 2007. The limitations on Czechs working in Germany expired in April 2011.

== See also ==
- Protection of Czechoslovak borders during the Cold War
- Czech Republic–Germany relations
