= Haidberg bei Zell =

Mountain in Bavaria, Germany

Coordinates: 50°07′53″N 11°48′06″E

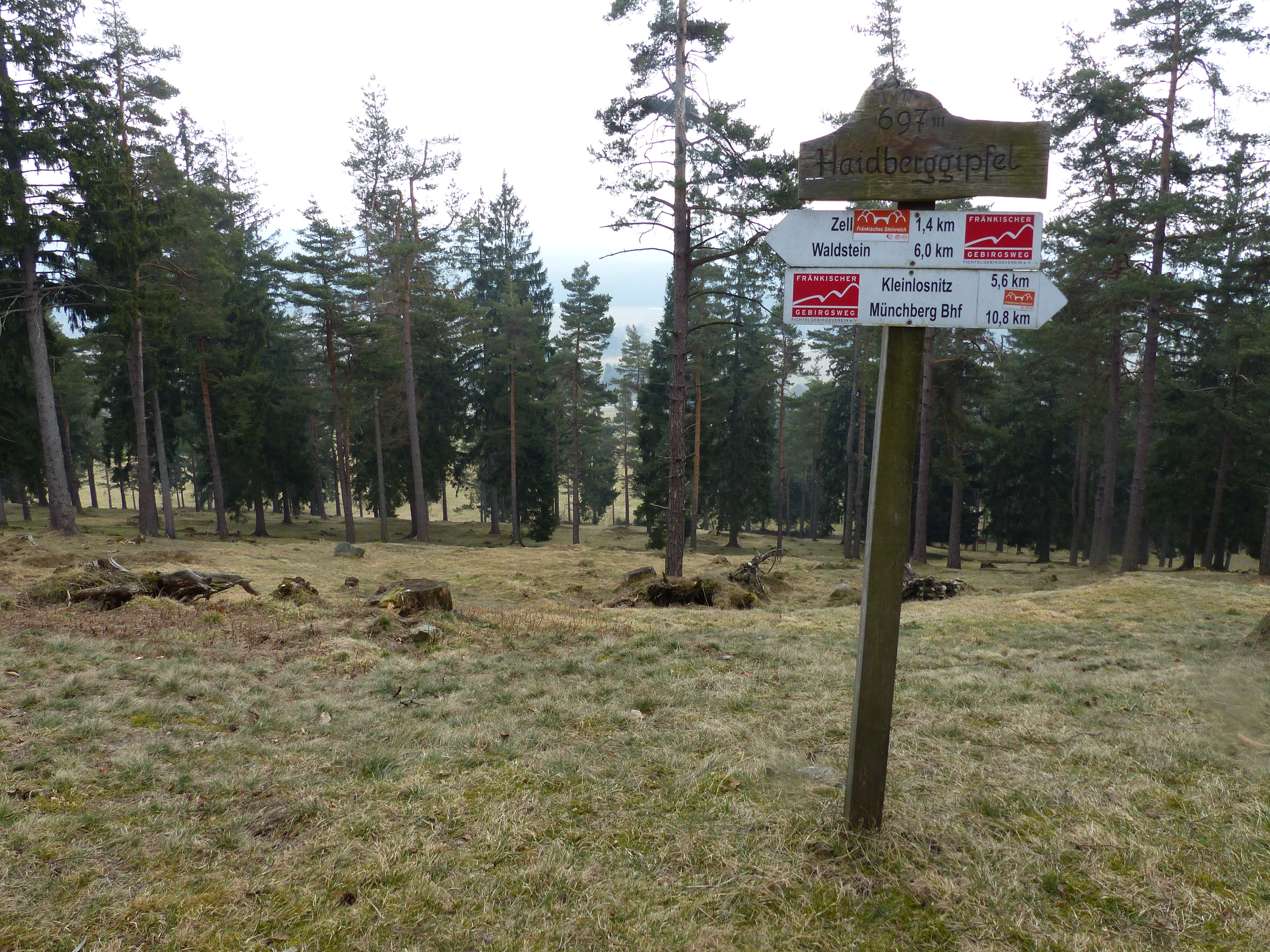
- Haidberg Zell 2015

Highest point
- Elevation: 692.5 m (2,272 ft)

Geography
- Location: Bavaria, Germany

Haidberg bei Zell is a mountain in Bavaria, Germany. It is somewhat close to the Czech border.
