= Mníšek (Nová Ves v Horách) =

- Village
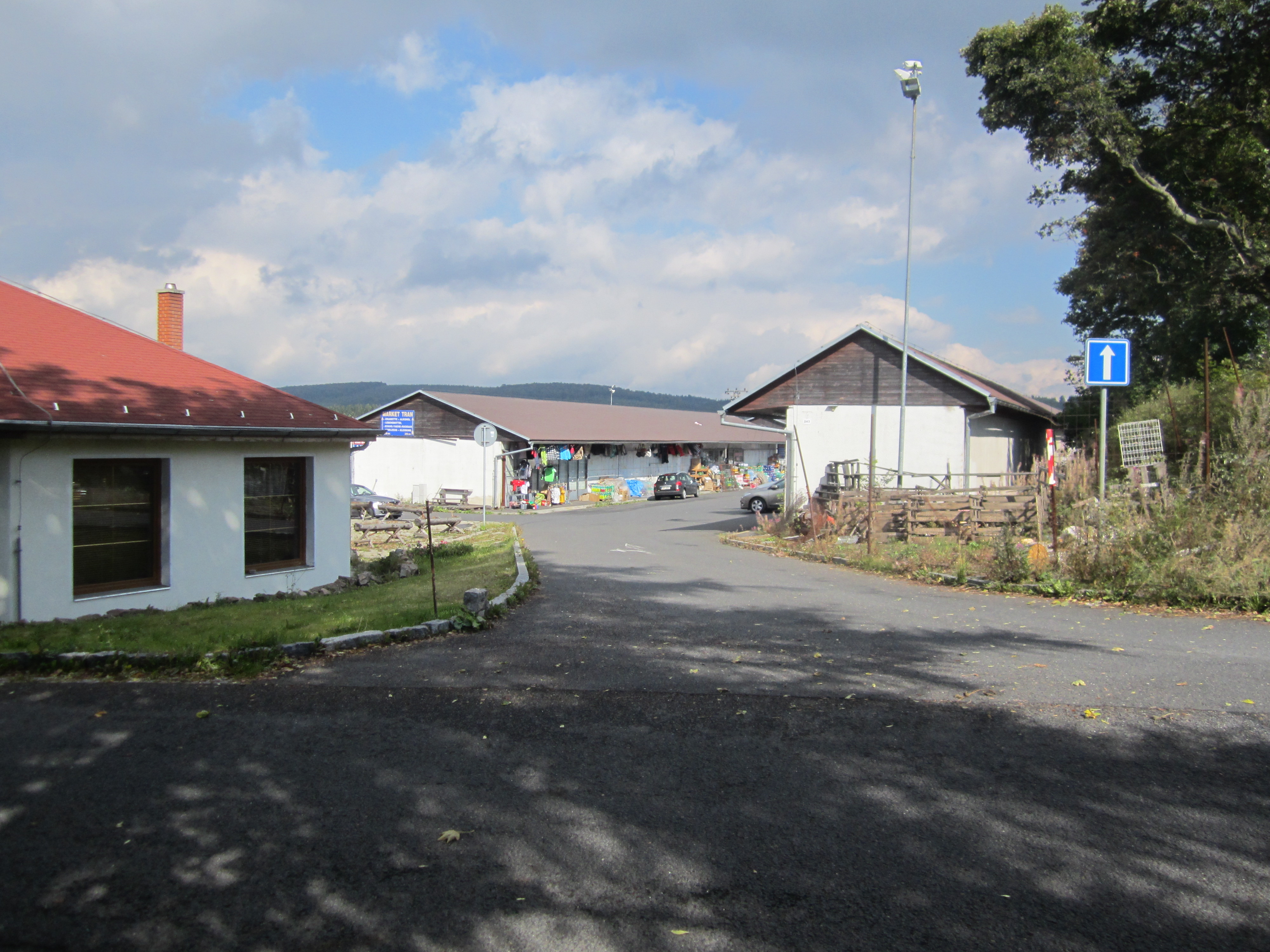
- Centre of the village

- Location in the Czech Republic
- Coordinates: 50°37′41″N 13°30′12″E
- Country: Czech Republic
- Region: Ústí nad Labem
- District: Most
- Municipality: Nová Ves v Horách

Area
  - Total: 7.7289 km^{2} (2.9841 sq mi)
- Highest elevation: 765 m (2,510 ft)
- Lowest elevation: 700 m (2,300 ft)

Population (1 March 2001)
  - Total: 8
  - Density: 1.0/km^{2} (2.7/sq mi)
- Postal code: 435 45
- Website: www.novavesvhorach.cz

Mníšek (German: Einsiedl) is a hamlet in the municipality of Nová Ves v Horách in the Ústí nad Labem Region in the Czech Republic. The formerly peaceful resort became one of the liveliest places in the Most District in the Ore Mountains after the opening of the Mníšek/Deutscheinsiedel border crossing.

The village lies at an elevation of 700 to 765 metres above sea level. It is separated from the village of the same (German) name in Germany by the river Schweinitz.
