= Teufelsmauer (Ore Mountains) =

Coordinates: 50.6257°N 13.2394°E

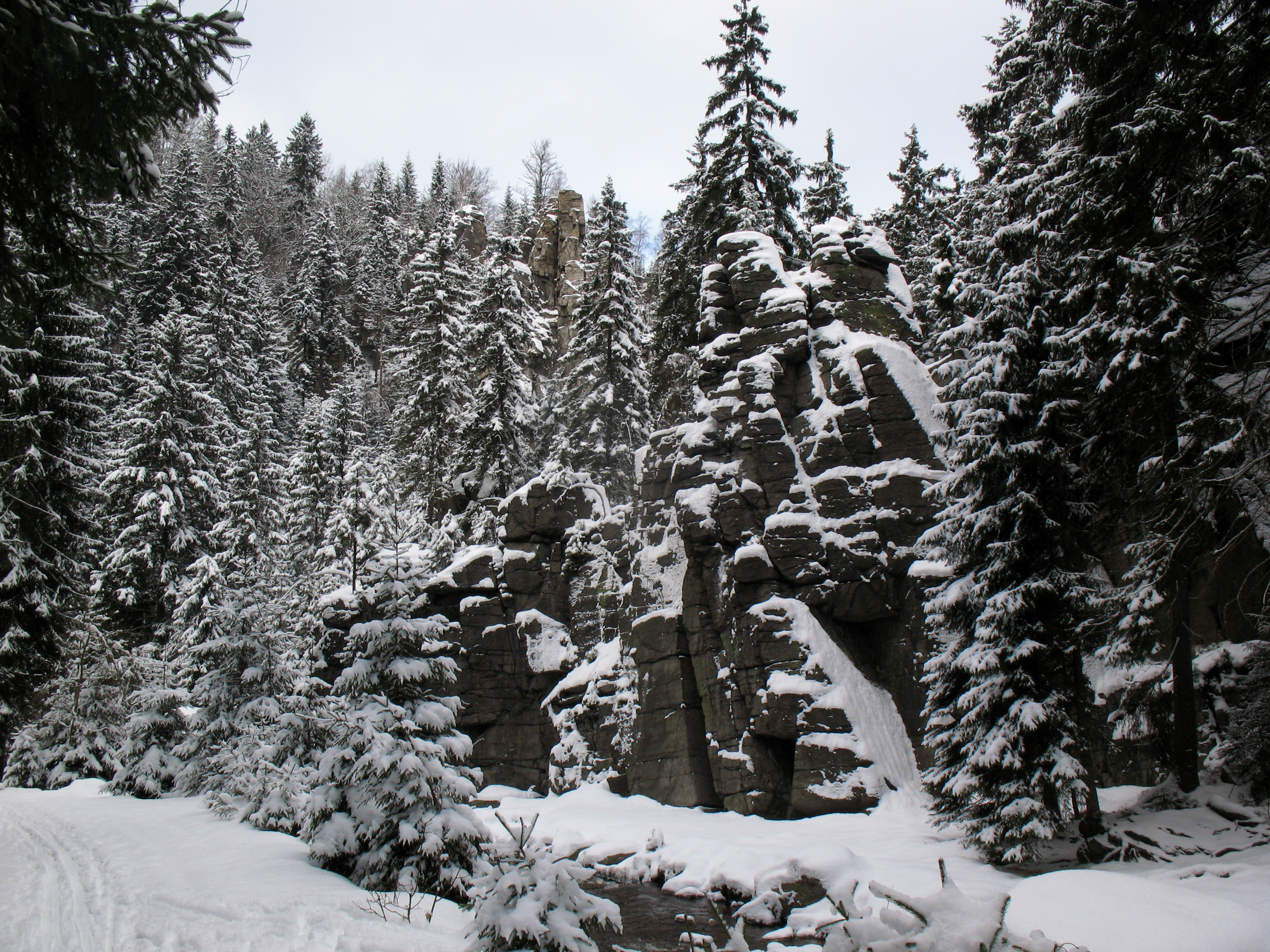
Western end of the Teufelsmauer by the Black Pockau. Behind is the Nonnenfelsen

The Teufelsmauer is a rock massif in the valley of the Black Pockau between Pobershau and Germany's state border with the Czech Republic. It is made of red and gray gneiss. The valley is also known as the Schwarzwasser ("Black Water"). A channel called the Grüne Graben ("Green Ditch") runs down the western slopes of the valley that used to provide the necessary water for the mines near Pobershau.

The Teufelsmauer is known today for its rock climbing.

While still researched, the origin of the structure is hypothesized to be a result of a pressurized expulsion of silica-enriched water. This would erode and deposit silica onto the structure, constructing the overall form over a geologic time-scale.
