= Liebenstein Castle =

Liebenstein Castle may refer to castles in Germany:

- Liebenstein Castle (Thuringia)
- Liebenstein Castle (Rhine)
- Liebenstein Castle (Saxony)
