= Wilisch =

Wilisch may refer to:

- Wilisch (river), of Saxony, Germany
- Wilisch (mountain), in Saxony, Germany
