= Eppendorf, Saxony =

Eppendorf
- Municipality
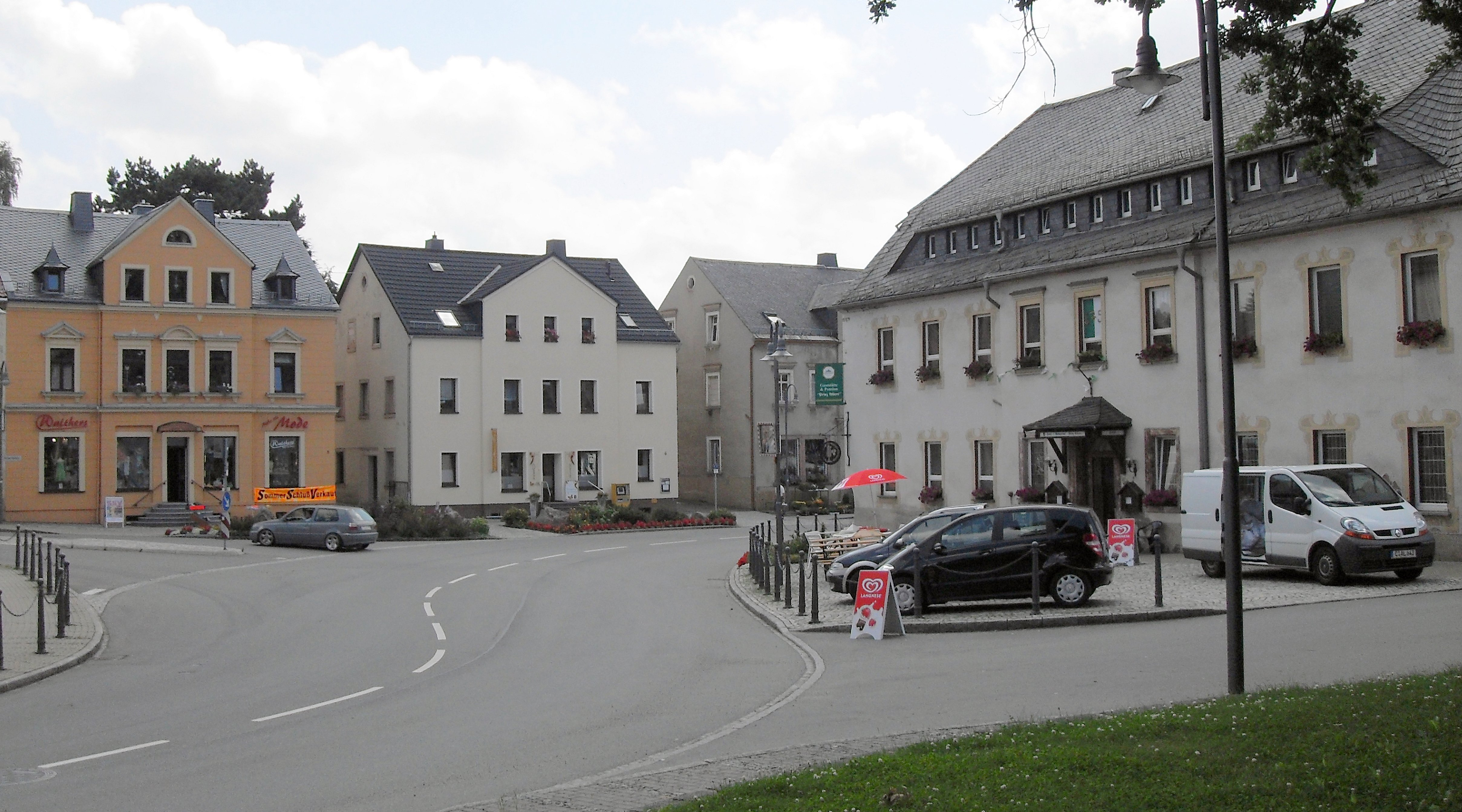

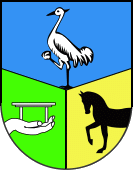
- Coat of arms

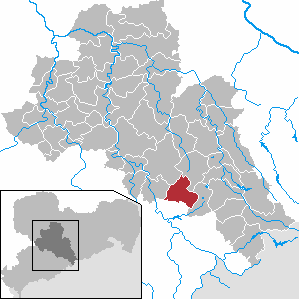
- Location of Eppendorf within Mittelsachsen district
- Interactive map of Eppendorf
- Location within Germany Location within Saxony
- Coordinates: 50°47′57″N 13°13′40″E
- Country: Germany
- State: Saxony
- District: Mittelsachsen
- Subdivisions: 3

Government
  - Mayor (2022–29): Axel Röthling (SPD)

Area
  - Total: 33.88 km^{2} (13.08 sq mi)
- Elevation: 460 m (1,510 ft)

Population (2025-12-31)
  - Total: 3,740
  - Density: 110/km^{2} (286/sq mi)
- Time zone: UTC+01:00 (CET)
  - Summer (DST): UTC+02:00 (CEST)
- Postal codes: 09575
- Dialling codes: 037293
- Vehicle registration: FG
- Website: www.gemeinde-eppendorf.de

Eppendorf (German pronunciation: [ˈɛpn̩dɔʁf]) is a municipality in the district of Mittelsachsen, in Saxony, Germany.

== Geography ==
The municipality of Eppendorf lies in the lower Ore Mountains, about 20 kilometres east of the city of Chemnitz and 15 kilometres southwest of Freiberg. Eppendorf runs along the river of the Große Lößnitz, a tributary of the Flöha.

The neighbouring, formerly independent villages of Kleinhartmannsdorf and Großwaltersdorf were integrated in 1995 and 1998, respectively.

== History ==
Eppendorf was founded in the 13th century as a new settlement in the form of a Waldhufendorf. The first official mention occurred in 1336. For most of its early history, it was a farming village and later also the location of a hunting lodge of Elector Augustus of Saxony.

In the late 19th century, some industry developed (manufacturing of toys, shoes, textile products and furniture). Today, the economy is mostly based on small businesses and traditional craftsmanship, farming and tourism.
