= Teufelsmauer (disambiguation) =

Teufelsmauer is German for "Devil's Wall" and may refer to:

- Teufelsmauer (Harz), a line of rocks in the foreland of the Harz Mountains in central Germany
- Teufelsmauer (Ore Mountains), a rock massif in the valley of the Black Pockau river in eastern Germany
- Teufelsmauer (North Bohemia), a natural monument in Northern Bohemia (Czech Republic)
- A walled part of the limes, the Roman border fortification in Germania
