= Natzschung =

River in the Czech Republic and Germany

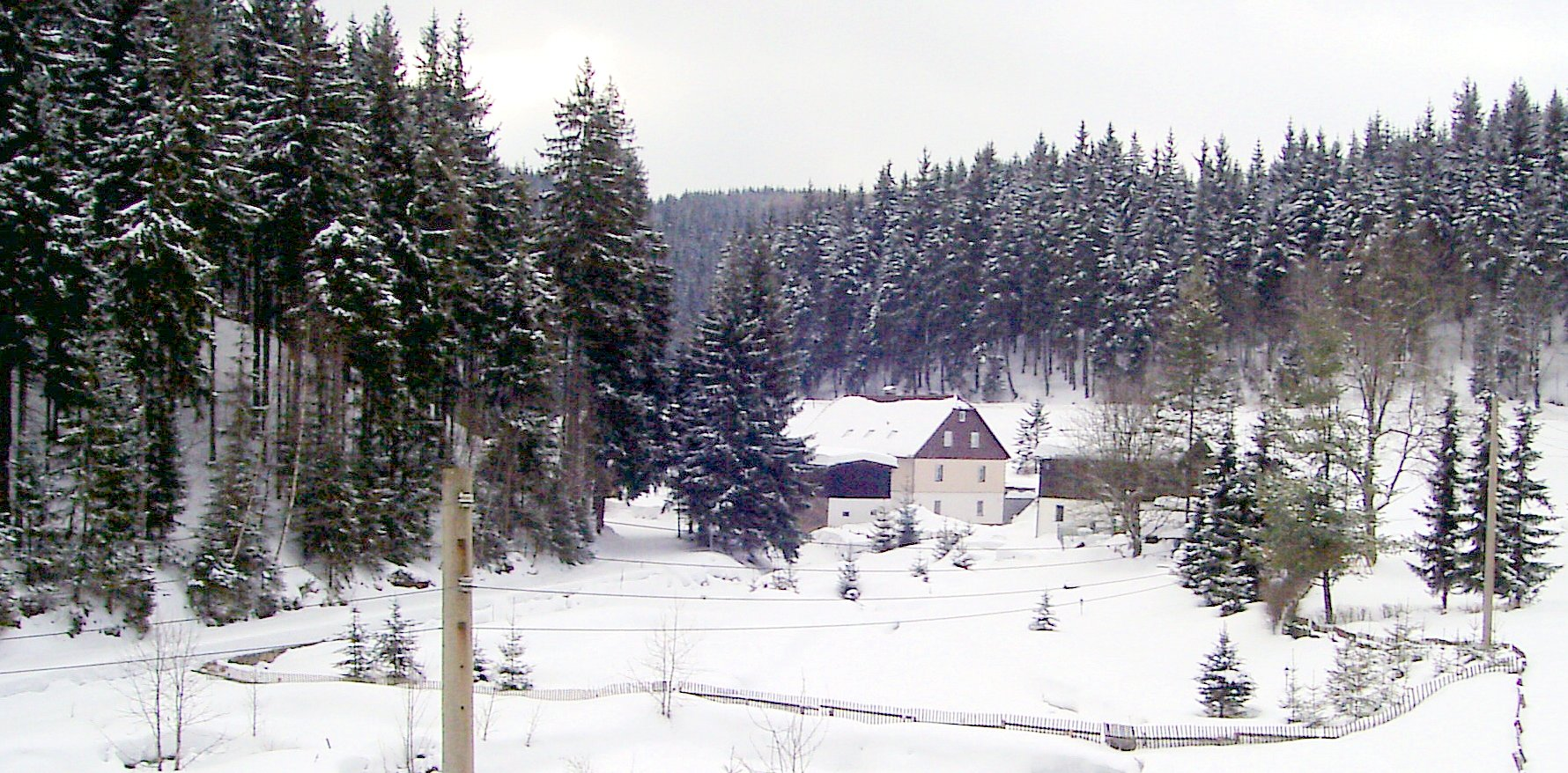
- Valley of Natzschung river between Rübenau and Rothental

Location
- Countries: Czech Republic; Germany

Physical characteristics
- Source
  - location: near Načetín
  - coordinates: 50.5502°N 13.2700°E
  - elevation: 820 m (2,690 ft)
- Mouth
  - location: Flöha, Olbernhau
  - coordinates: 50.6508°N 13.3702°E
  - elevation: 468 m (1,535 ft)
- Length: 16.5 km (10.3 mi)
- Basin size: 80.3 km^{2} (31.0 sq mi)

Basin features
- Progression: Flöha→ Zschopau→ Freiberger Mulde→ Mulde→ Elbe→ North Sea

The Natzschung (Czech: Načetínský potok) is a river in Bohemia (Czech Republic) and Saxony (Germany). It is a left tributary of the Flöha, which it joins in Olbernhau. For much of its length it forms the border between Czech Republic and Germany.

== See also ==
- List of rivers of Saxony
- List of rivers of the Czech Republic
