= Schweinitz (stream) =

Stream in Germany and the Czech Republic

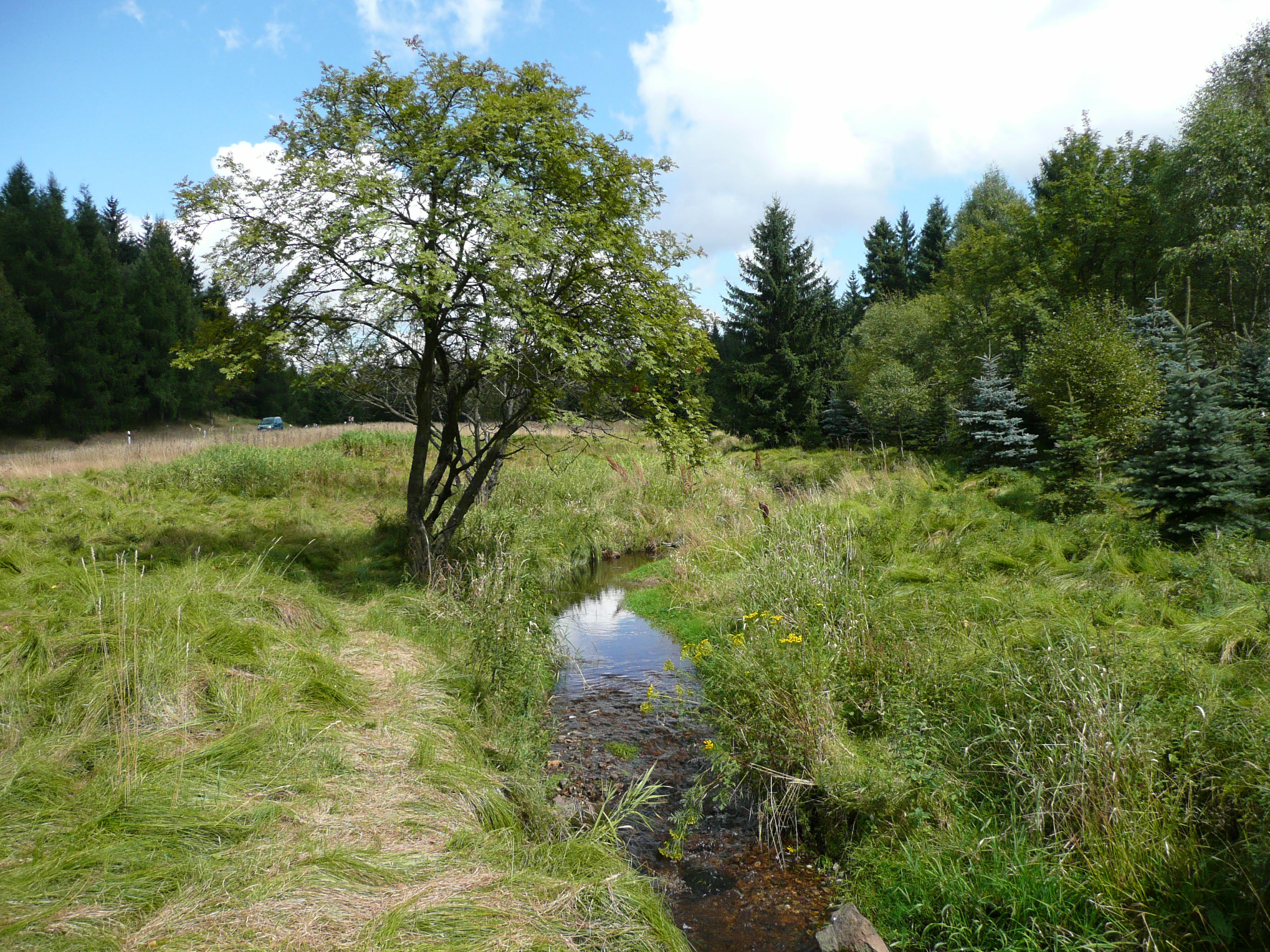
- The Schweinitz near Deutschneudorf

Location
- Countries: Czech Republic; Germany
- Region: Ústí nad Labem
- State: Saxony

Physical characteristics
- Mouth
  - location: Flöha
  - coordinates: 50.6465°N 13.3919°E

Basin features
- Progression: Flöha→ Zschopau→ Freiberger Mulde→ Mulde→ Elbe→ North Sea

The Schweinitz (Czech: Svídnice) is a stream in the Czech Republic and Germany. It is a left tributary of the Flöha, which it joins near Olbernhau. Almost the entire course of the stream forms the Czech–German border.

== See also ==
- List of rivers of Saxony
- List of rivers of the Czech Republic
