= Wilisch (river) =

River in Germany

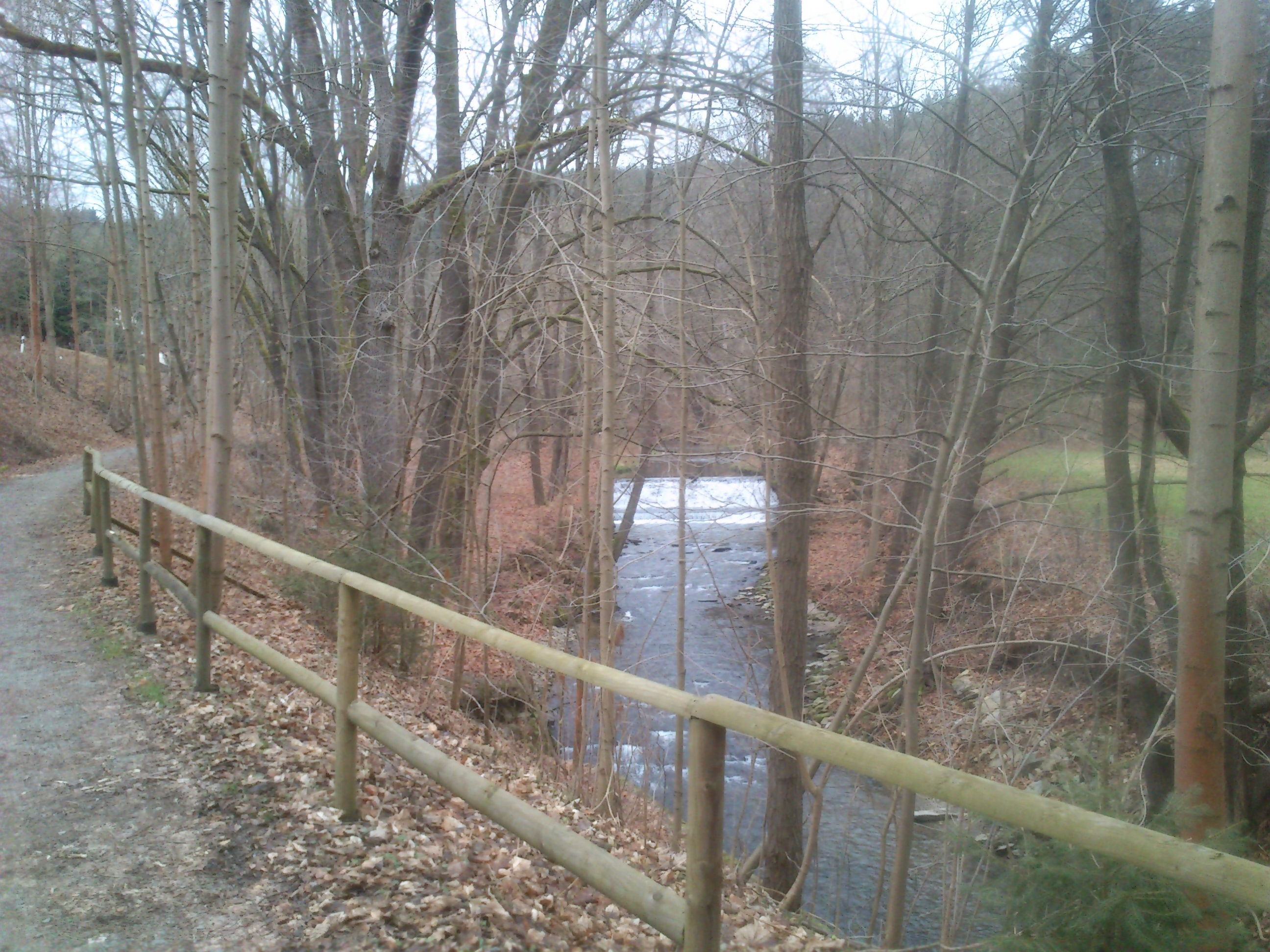

Location
- Country: Germany
- State: Saxony

Physical characteristics
- Mouth
  - location: Zschopau
  - coordinates: 50.7263°N 13.0567°E

Basin features
- Progression: Zschopau→ Freiberger Mulde→ Mulde→ Elbe→ North Sea

The Wilisch is a river of Saxony, Germany. It is a left tributary of the Zschopau, which it joins near the town Zschopau.

== See also ==
- List of rivers of Saxony
