= Black Pockau =

River in Germany

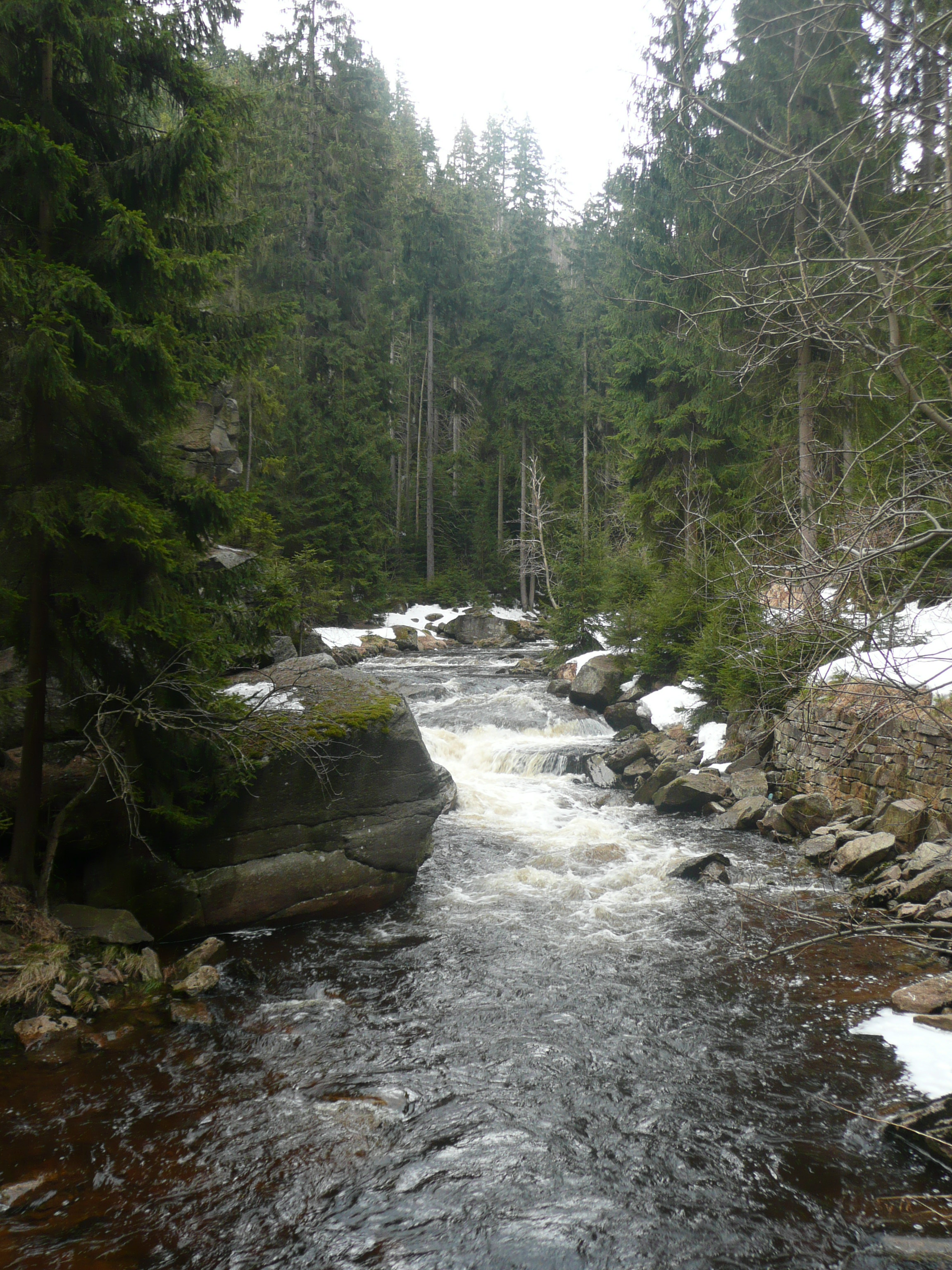
- The Black Pockau south of the Nonnenfelsen rocks between Kühnhaide and Pobershau
- Native name: Schwarze Pockau (German)

Location
- Countries: Germany; Czech Republic

Physical characteristics
- Source
  - location: Source region: in a raised bog northeast of the Haßberg
  - elevation: 890 m above sea level (NN)
- Mouth
  - location: In Pockau into the Flöha
  - coordinates: 50°42′18.36″N 13°14′6.41″E
- Length: ca. 33 km (21 mi)
- Discharge
  - location: at Zöblitz (3.7 km (2.3 mi) above its mouth) gauge
  - average: 2.3 m^{3}/s (81 cu ft/s)
  - minimum: Record low: 20 L/s (in 1947); Average low: 438 L/s
  - maximum: Average high: 23.6 m^{3}/s (830 cu ft/s); Record high: 160 m^{3}/s (5,700 cu ft/s) (in 2002)

Basin features
- Progression: Flöha→ Zschopau→ Freiberger Mulde→ Mulde→ Elbe→ North Sea
- Landmarks: Villages: Pobershau, Pockau
- Tributaries
  - left: Red Pockau

The Black Pockau (German: Schwarze Pockau or Schwarzwasser, Czech: Černá) is a river of Saxony, Germany, in the Ore Mountains. It is a left tributary of the Flöha. This virtually unspoilt wild stream with a length of 33 km (21 mi) is known for the picturesque gorge in its middle reaches.

Its murky waters flowing from bogs in the hills give the river a dark colour. The name Pockau, which was recorded in similar form in 1292, probably comes from the Czech and means "opposed", i.e. a stream flowing from Bohemia towards the north.

== Course ==
The Black Pockau rises 890 metres above sea level (NHN) in a raised bog northeast of the Jelení hora in the Bohemian Ore Mountains. The Chomutovka (German: Assigbach), which flows into the Czech Republic, also has its source here.

After 500 metres (1,600 ft), the stream reaches the German-Czech border at the old road between Přísečnice (Preßnitz) and Kalek (Kallich) and flows through the Satzung municipal pond (Satzunger Gemeindeteich). From here on, it forms the national border for 13 kilometres (8.1 mi), as far as the village of Kühnhaide (a district of Marienberg). In this section it passes the villages of Satzung (the former village of Ulmbach (Jilmová) on the Bohemian side opposite was demolished in 1945) and Reitzenhain (the village of Pohraniční, that used to be on the Bohemian side, was also abandoned).

In Reitzenhain, from the rafting pond (Floßteich) by the Neue Welt mill, a ditch known as the Reitzenhainer Zeuggraben provided water from the Black Pockau for overshot waterwheels at the old mines near Marienberg. Water is also diverted from the river at the eastern end of Kühnhaide: the Green Ditch (Grüner Graben) once fed water for overshot wheels at the mine on the Wildsberg mountain near Pobershau. The village of Kienhaid (Načetín I), that formerly stood on the Bohemian side of the border here, was abandoned. East of Kühnhaide the river changes direction from northeast to north.

The next section of the valley as far as the Kniebreche, the gorge-like Schwarzwasser valley (Schwarzwassertal), is considered one of the most picturesque of German valleys in the Central Uplands and is protected as the Schwarzwassertal nature reserve. Around 1985, a dam with a storage capacity of 3.5 million cubic metres (120×10^{6} cu ft) was planned to be built in the southern section, which would have seen the loss of Kühnhaide. These plans, however, were shelved.

In running through this ravine-like valley, the river passes historically important witnesses to the settlement of the Ore Mountains located on the left and right banks or in the nearby vicinity. These include the ruined castle of Nonnenfelsen and the former robber baron castle of Liebenstein as well as the abandoned village of Ullersdorf that may have been associated with it.

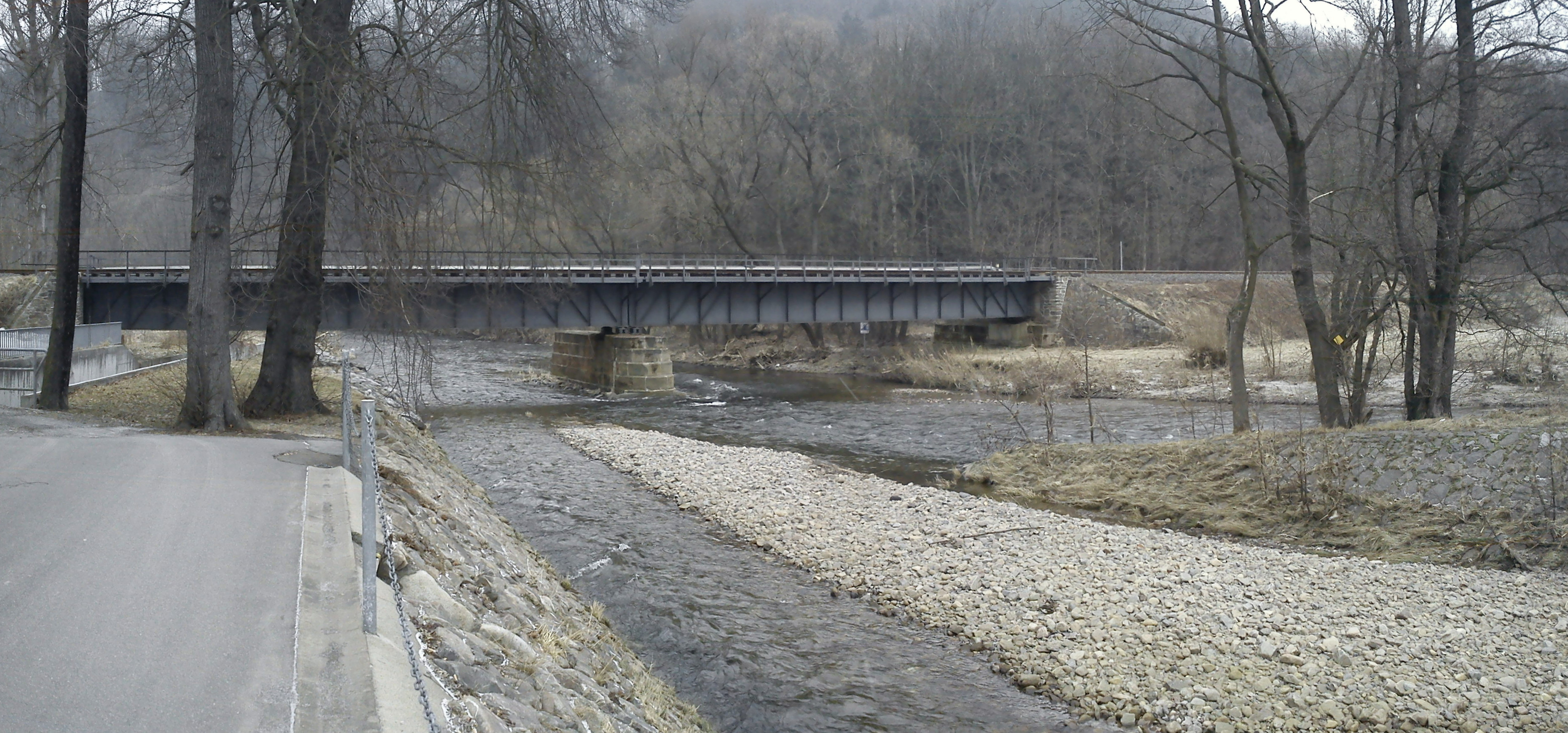
Mouth of the Black Pockau on the Flöha in Pockau

In the remote Pobershau scattered village of Hinterer Grund a hydropower station is fed by water from an artificial ditch or Kunstgraben. This is the location of the Pobershau conservation station, which offers support to those interested in nature. At the Kniebreche near Rittersberg the river is joined by the Red Pockau. From here on, in old maps, the river is just known as the Pockau or Große Pockau (Great Pockau).

North of the Kniebreche on both sides of the river are more historic sites. On the right hand bank is the ruined Nidberg Castle on the crags of the Löwenkopffelsen that rise 50 metres (160 ft) above the valley floor, and the deserted village of Schwedengraben, an old mining settlement, on a slip-off slope of the river valley.

Near Niederlauterstein, where the Lautenbach stream joins the river, the Black Pockau passes the ruins of Lauterstein Castle. Further north the Knesenbach, which rises near Ansprung (a district of Marienberg), empties into the river. Further downstream it passes the Strobel Mill, which still uses water power. Here there is a water gauge belonging to the Saxon State Office for the Environment and Geology; its readings are taken regularly and available on the internet. In the municipality of Pockau the Black Pockau finally empties into the Flöha.

== Economic use ==
In addition to the water diverted by historic ditches for mining purposes, below Kühnhaide and near the Kniebreche are two active weirs that use the river's water power. Their use has been questioned because of their effect on the river bed.

== Tourism and sport ==
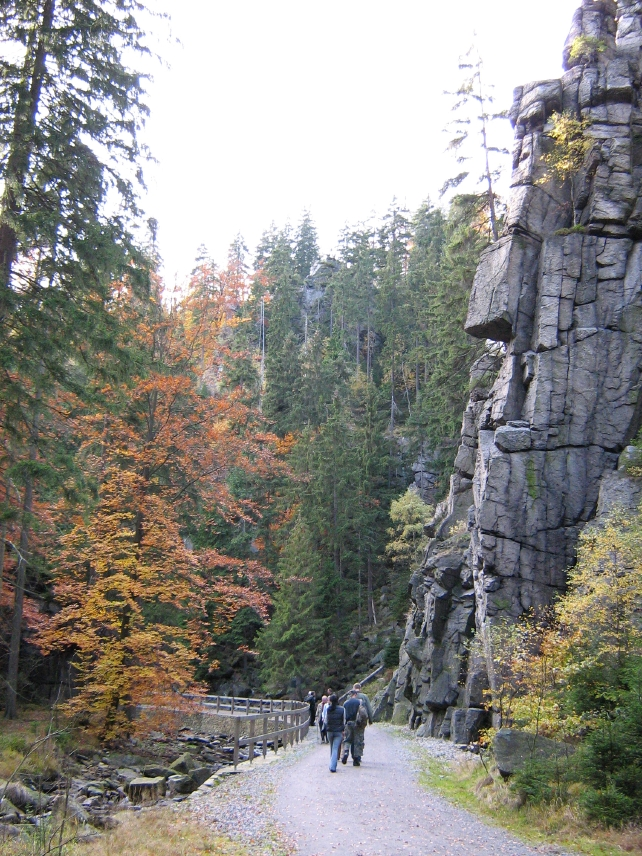
The Nonnenfelsen in the Schwarzwasser valley

Walking and cycling through the Schwarzwasser valley are possible, both along the river and the along the Grüner Graben on the hillside above the river.

The river is suitable for canoeing and white water rafting. The "classic" 10-kilometre-long (6.2 mi) continuous section between Hinterer Grund and Pockau is even navigable at relatively low water levels. By contrast, several kilometres of challenging white water between Kühnhaide (start) and Hinterer Grund require high water levels.

Fishing is possible with a permit on the section from Pobershau as far as the confluence with the Flöha. The main species are rainbow trout, brown trout, brook trout, eel and various minnows.

== Exceptional high water ==
- 5 July 1999 after regional storms
- 12 August 2002 during the flooding of the Elbe

== See also ==
List of rivers of Saxony
