= Pobershau =

- Ortsteil of Marienberg
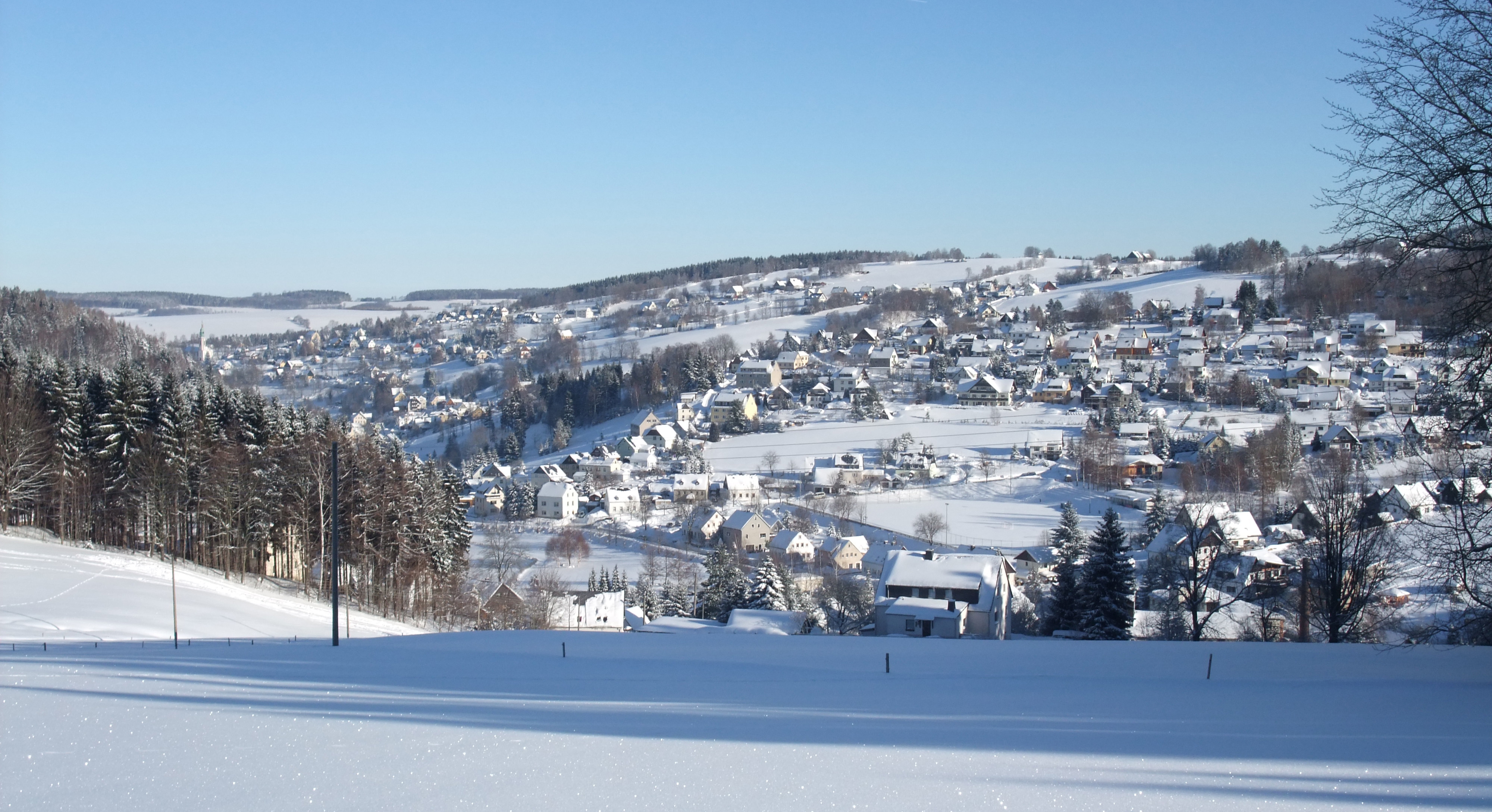
- Pobershau

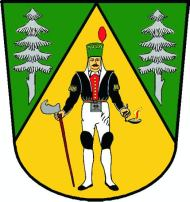
- Coat of arms
- Interactive map of Pobershau
- Location within Germany Location within Saxony
- Coordinates: 50°38′N 13°13′E
- Country: Germany
- State: Saxony
- District: Erzgebirgskreis
- Town: Marienberg
- Subdivisions: 2

Area
  - Total: 5.41 km^{2} (2.09 sq mi)
- Elevation: 550 m (1,800 ft)

Population (2021)
  - Total: 1,761
  - Density: 326/km^{2} (843/sq mi)
- Time zone: UTC+01:00 (CET)
  - Summer (DST): UTC+02:00 (CEST)
- Postal codes: 09496
- Dialling codes: 03735
- Vehicle registration: ERZ
- Website: www.pobershau.de

Pobershau is a former municipality in the district Erzgebirgskreis, in Saxony, Germany. With effect from 1 January 2012, it has been incorporated into the town of Marienberg.

== Geography ==
Pobershau lies in the valley of the Red Pockau, a tributary of the Black Pockau. The hamlet of Rittersberg lies north of the main village on the left slopes of the Red Pockau. The hamlet of Hinterer Grund lie east of the village rather remotely in the valley of the Black Pockau. The highest point in Pobershaus lies at 700.5 m above NHN near the Katzensteine mountain. The lowest point is at 500 m above NHN in the Kniebreche, the area around the confluence of the Red and Black Pockau.

=== Subdivisions ===
The municipality is divided into:

- Pobershau
- Rittersberg
