= Zschopau (river) =

River in Germany

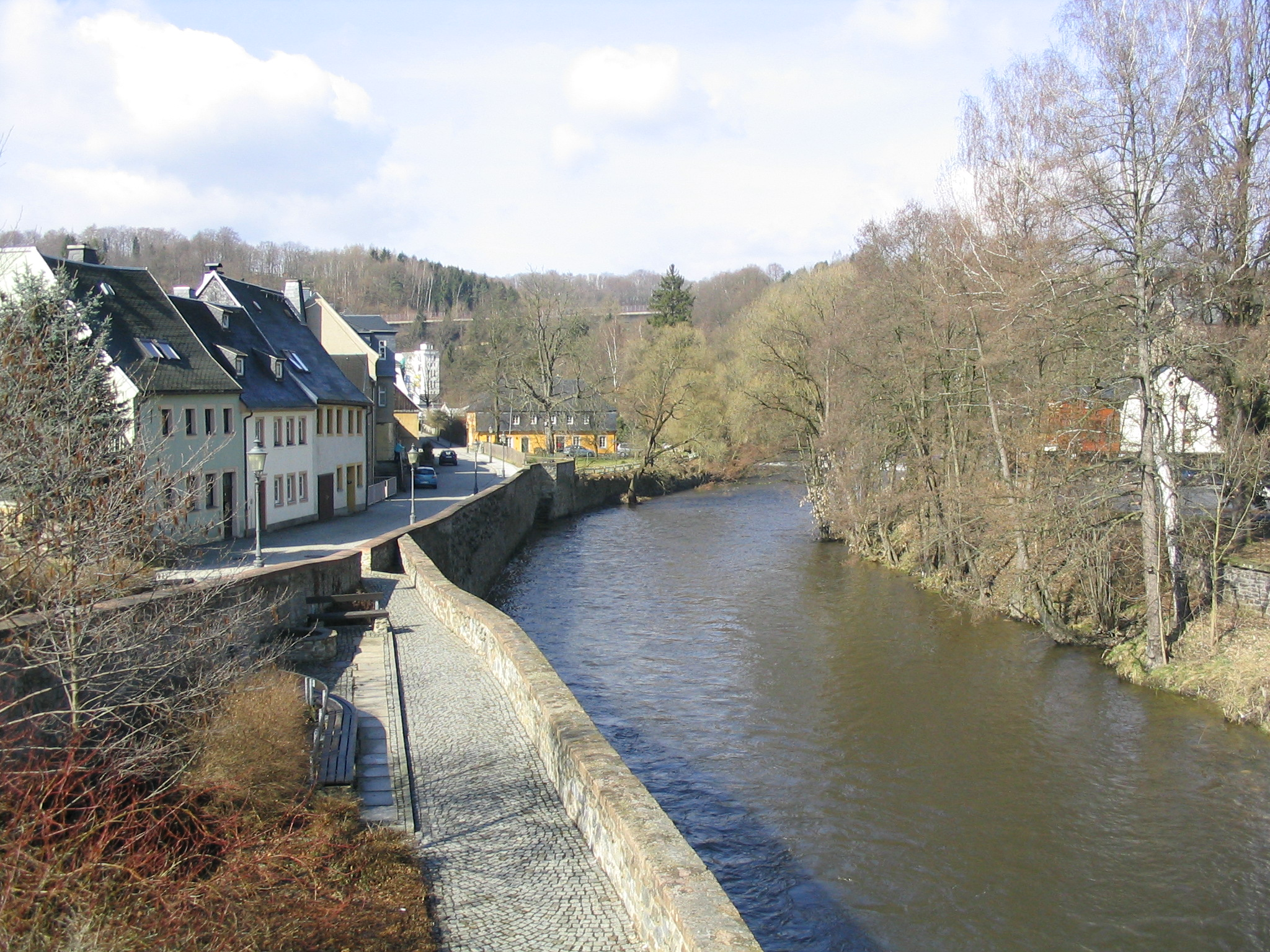
- The river in the town of Zschopau

Location
- Country: Germany
- State: Saxony

Physical characteristics
- Source
  - location: Fichtelberg, Ore Mountains
  - elevation: 1,125 m (3,691 ft)
- Mouth
  - location: Freiberger Mulde
  - coordinates: 51°7′46″N 13°3′7″E
- Length: 128 km (80 mi)
- Basin size: 1,750 km^{2} (680 sq mi)

Basin features
- Progression: Freiberger Mulde→ Mulde→ Elbe→ North Sea

The Zschopau (German pronunciation: [ˈtʃoːpaʊ]; Czech: Sapava [ˈsapava] or Šopava [ˈʃopava]) is a 130-kilometre-long river in Saxony, Germany, and a left tributary of the Freiberger Mulde. The origin of the name is not precisely documented, possibly Slavic skapp; rock, cliff or sorb. Šučici; the rushing, roaring). The Zschopau drains a catchment area of 1847 km².

== Course ==
Its source is in the Ore Mountains, on the slopes of the Fichtelberg at a height of 1,070 metres, near the border with Czechia. It flows initially parallel to the Große Mittweida in a northerly direction. The Zschopau forms the boundary between the western forest district of Crottendorf and the eastern districts of Oberwiesenthal and Neudorf. After leaving the forests on the Fichtelberg, it passes the forest settlement of Crottendorf with its hamlet of Walthersdorf.

In the town of Schlettau it is joined by the Rote Pfütze. It then flows through the towns of Tannenberg, Wiesa and Wiesenbad Thermal Springs. Then the Zschopau collects the waters of the Pöhlbach stream. Shortly before Wolkenstein it is joined by the Pressnitz.

The towns of Wolkenstein, Zschopau, Flöha, Frankenberg/Sa. and Mittweida are further down the river. Between Scharfenstein and Zschopau, its largest left-hand tributary, the Wilisch, flows into the river by the scattered settlement of Wilischthal. The tortuous, increasingly narrow and rocky Zschopau valley is followed by the structurally interesting Annaberg and Buchholz railway to Flöha.

In Flöha, north of the Augustusburg hunting lodge that dominates the valley landscape, it is joined by the largest tributary, named after the town. The Flöha is even slightly larger than the Zschopau here. The Zschopau is impounded by the Kriebstein Dam in the narrow valley above Kriebstein Castle. It continues to flow through the town of Waldheim, where it is followed by the Chemnitz and Riesa railway, which runs over six viaducts on the six-kilometre-long 'bankruptcy mile' section to Limmritz. The valley is narrow and steep in parts, so that the Zschopau Valley Cycleway is routed by it at a reasonable distance.

Finally, the river flows into the Freiberger Mulde near the village of Schweta west of Döbeln.

The Zschopau is 130 km long and, after combining with the Freiburge Mulde has a flow rate of 23.8 m³/s compared to 10.3 m³/s in the Freiberger Mulde above the confluence. (Note: The mean estuary discharges are determined from the values of the gauges at Lichtenwalde (Zschopau), Erlln, Nossen (Freiberger Mulde) and Niederstriegis 1 (Striegis). Discharge determined and multiplied by the Zschopau catchment area below the Lichtenwalde gauge.)

== Trails ==
The river has numerous roads and paths running alongside it. These trails are especially popular with cyclists. Mountain bikers often come here for tours. The undulating trails offer a brilliant riding experience to cycling enthusiasts. The trail is also known for the scenery, with castles and other medieval buildings appearing on the trail.

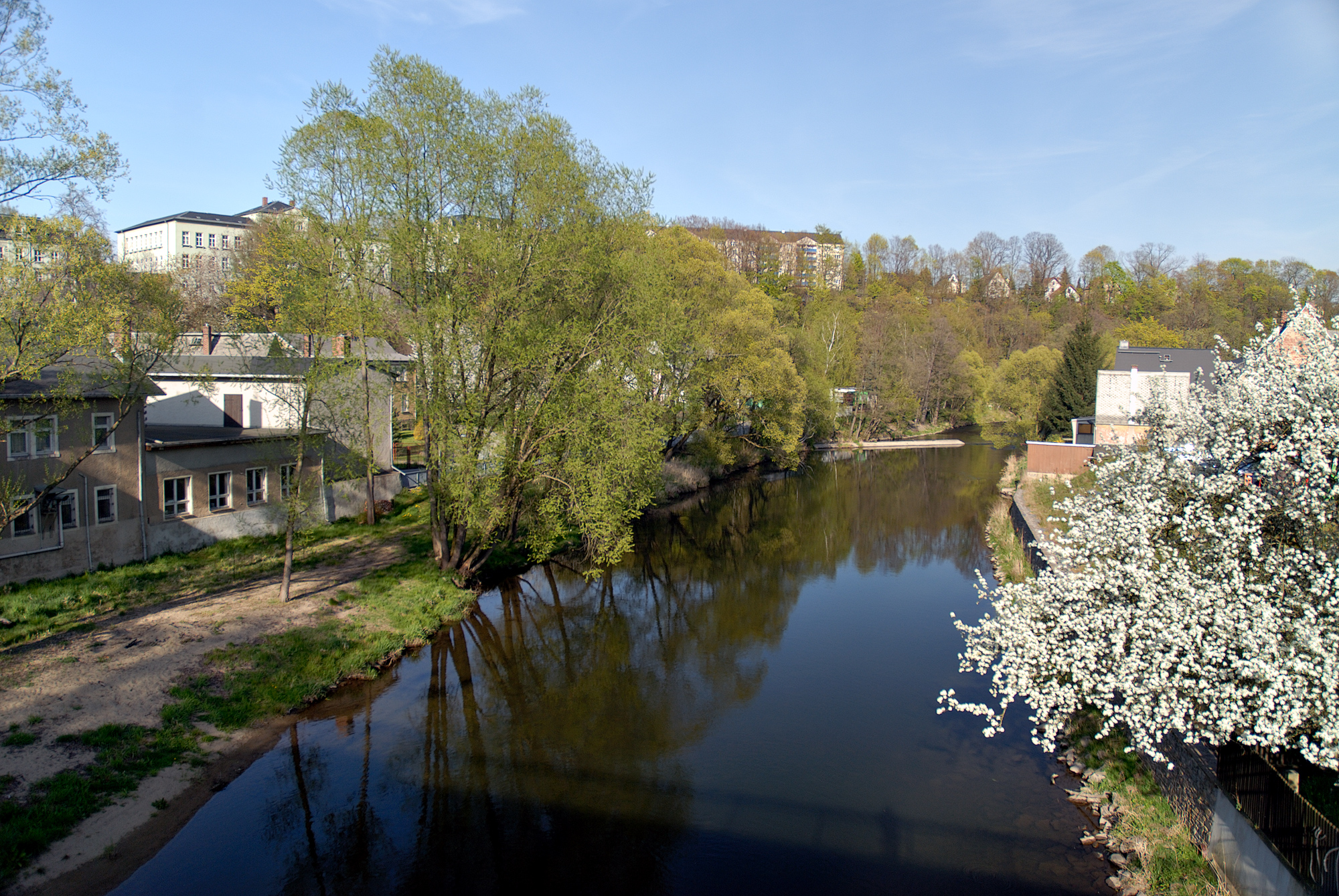
The Zschopau River in the town of Zschopau

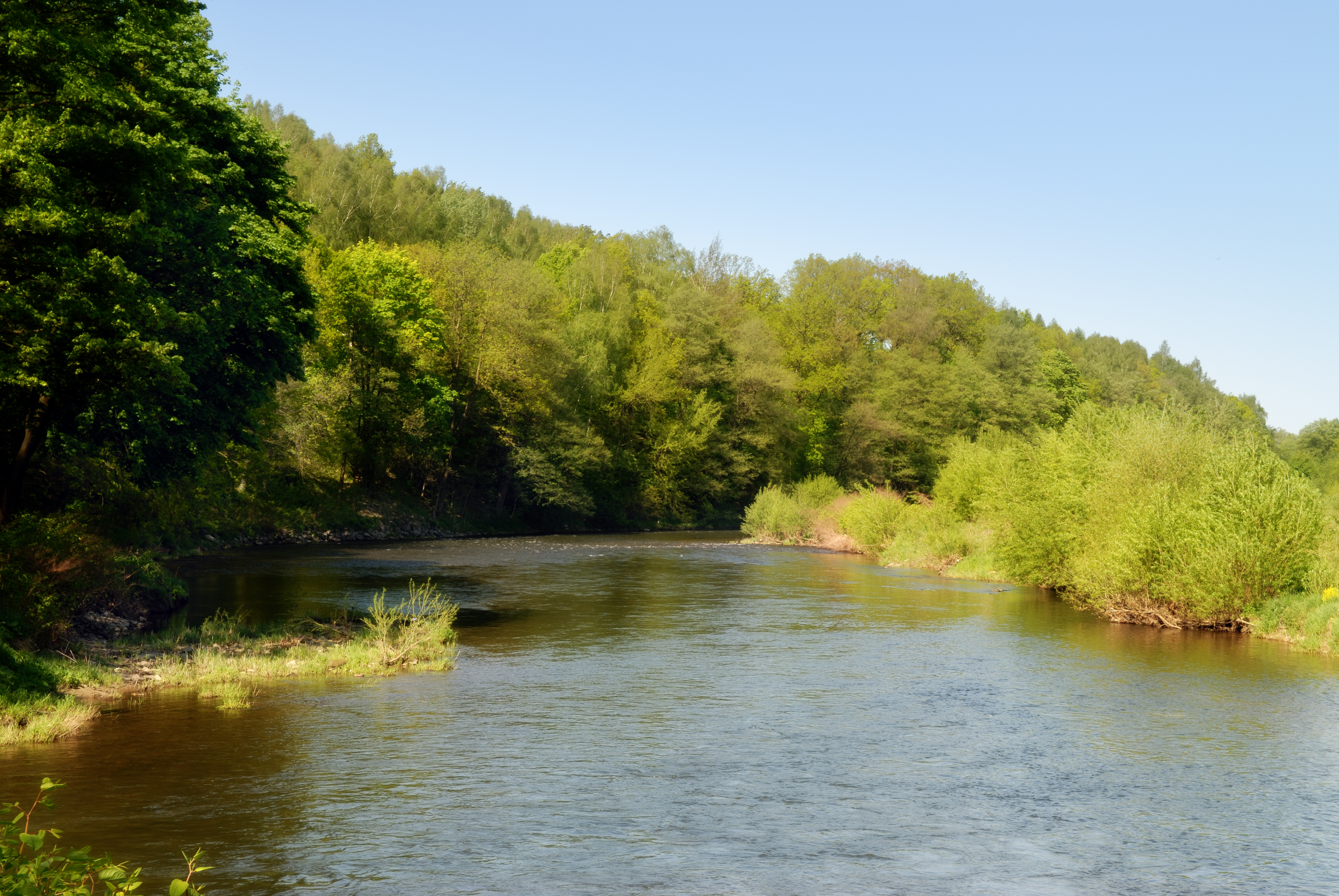
The confluence of the rivers Flöha and Zschopau in the town of Flöha

== See also ==
- List of rivers of Saxony
