= Flöha (river) =

River in Germany

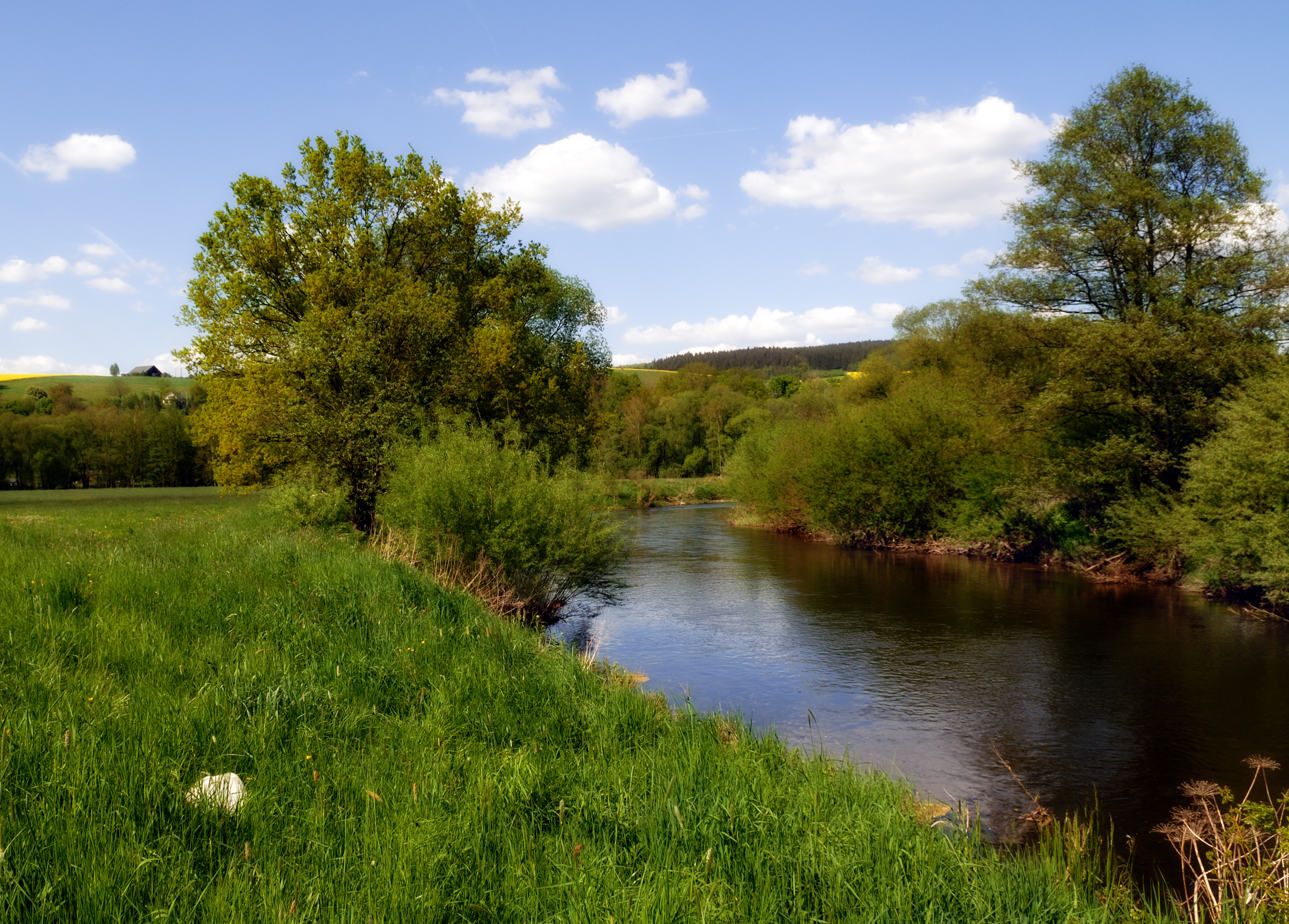
- The river Flöha in the borough of Flöha

Location
- Countries: Czech Republic; Germany
- Region (CZ): Ústí nad Labem
- State (DE): Saxony
- Reference no.: DE: 54268

Physical characteristics
- Source
  - location: Source region: 5 km east of Fláje
  - elevation: ca. 845 m above sea level (NHN)
- Mouth
  - location: In Flöha into the Zschopau
  - coordinates: 50°51′27″N 13°03′50″E
  - elevation: 268 m above sea level (NHN)
- Length: 67 km
- Basin size: 799.4 km^{2} (308.7 sq mi)
- Discharge
  - location: at Borstendorf gauge
  - average: 9.15 m^{3}/s (323 cu ft/s)
  - minimum: Record low: 0.2 m^{3}/s (7.1 cu ft/s) (in 22.07.1934); Average low: 1.68 m^{3}/s (59 cu ft/s)
  - maximum: Average high: 92 m^{3}/s (3,200 cu ft/s); Record high: 540 m^{3}/s (19,000 cu ft/s) (in 13.08.2002)

Basin features
- Progression: Zschopau→ Freiberger Mulde→ Mulde→ Elbe→ North Sea
- River system: Elbe
- Tributaries
  - left: Black Pockau
- Waterbodies: Reservoirs: Fláje Reservoir, Rauschenbach Reservoir

The Flöha (German pronunciation: [ˈfløːa]; Czech: Flájský potok) is a river in Saxony, Germany, and the Czech Republic. It flows into the river Zschopau in the town Flöha.

== See also ==
- List of rivers of Saxony
- List of rivers of the Czech Republic
