= Adlerstein =

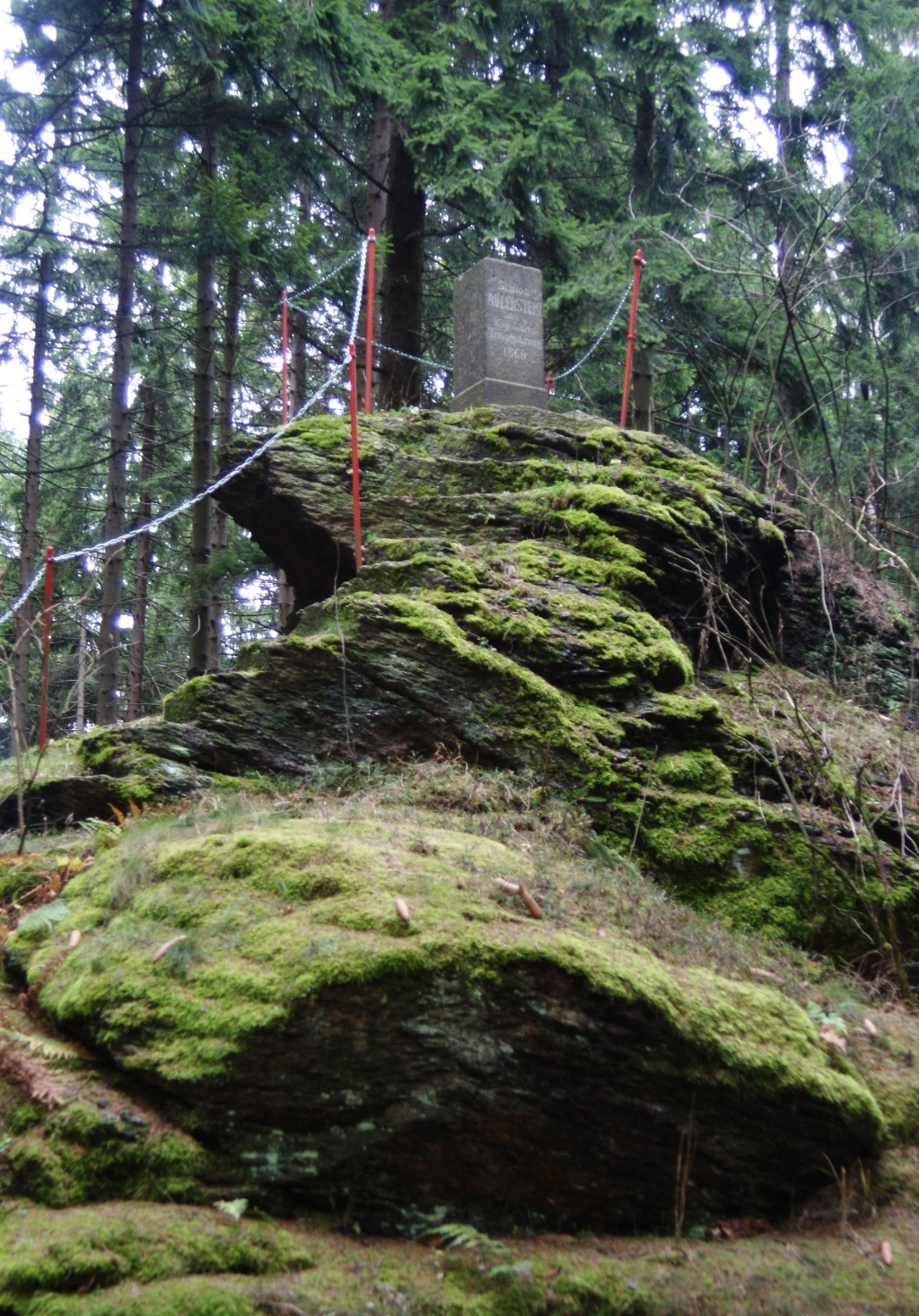
- Summit of the Adlerstein with its trig point

Highest point
- Elevation: 676 m (2,218 ft)
- Coordinates: 50°41′56″N 13°09′48″E

Geography
- Location within Saxony
- Location: Saxony (Germany)
- Parent range: Ore Mountains

The Adlerstein is a 676-metre-high summit in the Saxon Ore Mountains near Lengefeld. At the top there is a historic triangulation station which was part of the Royal Saxon triangulation network.

== Location and area ==
The Adlerstein lies in the Central Ore Mountains not far from the B 101 federal road that runs from Heinzebank to Pockau where there is a junction with the Lengefeld Road not far away. Immediately at the foot of the mountain is the well-known Lengefeld Lime Works (Kalkwerk Lengefeld). The Adlerstein and the nearby peak of the Lauterbacher Knochen complement one another as good viewing points, albeit partly obscured by trees in places.

== Views ==
The other places that may be seen from the Adlerstein include the Sayda and Brand Heights, Waldkirchen, Marienberg, Dittersdorfer Höhe and Pöhlberg in Germany, and the Jelení hora (Haßberg), Hora Svaté Kateřiny (Katharinaberg) and the Čihadlo (Lauschhübei) in the Czech Republic.

== Sources ==
- Das mittlere Zschopaugebiet. Edition no. 1 Akademie-Verlag Berlin, Berlin 1977 (Werte unserer Heimat. Vol. 28). p. 200.
