= Berggeschrey =

Berggeschrey or Berggeschrei ("mining clamour") was a German term for the rapid spread of news on the discovery of rich ore deposits that led to the rapid establishment of a mining region, as in the silver rush in the early days of silver ore mining in the Ore Mountains. It is similar in some respects to the gold rush in North America.

== First Berggeschrey ==
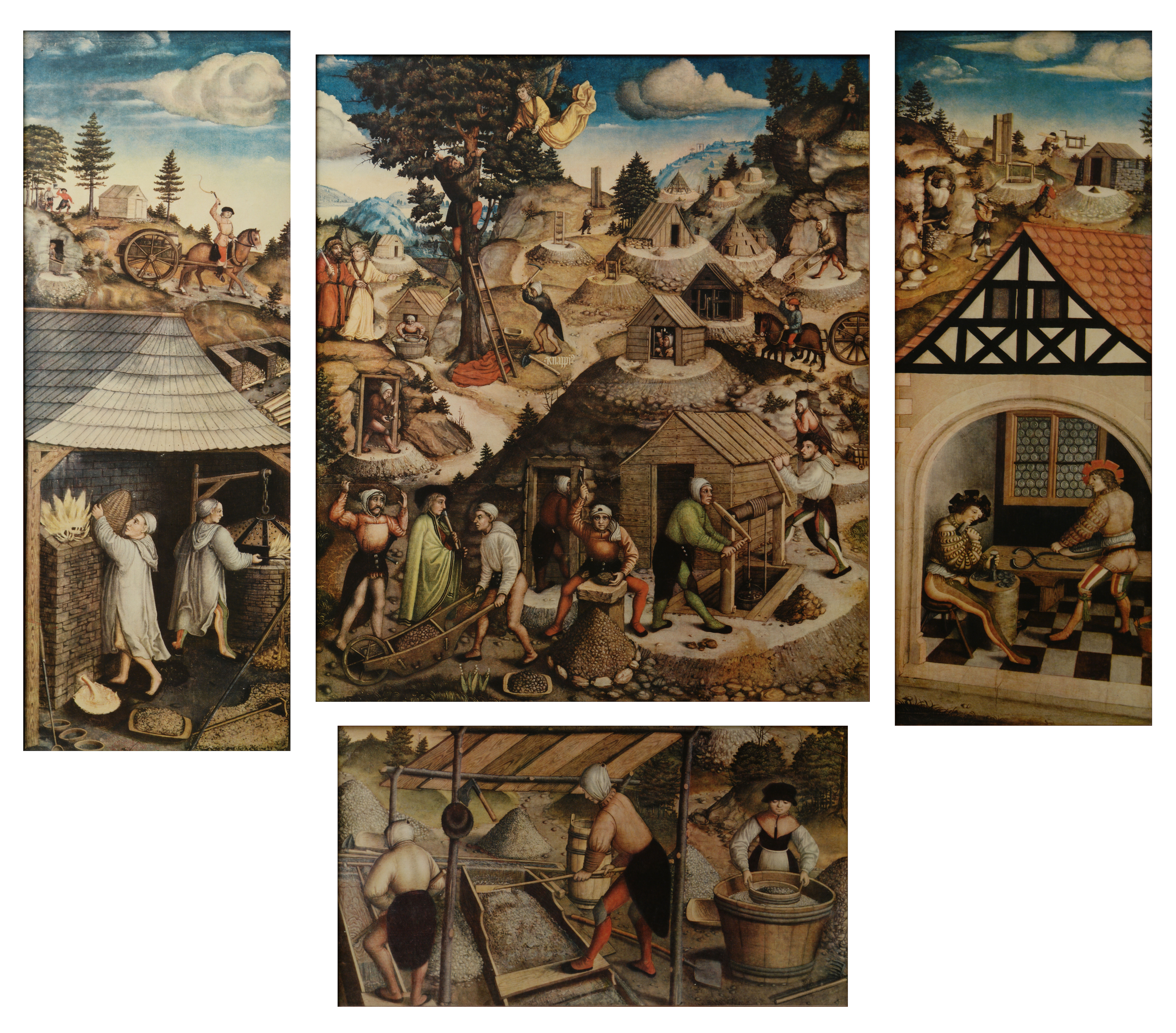
1522 depiction of the historic mining industry on Annaberg's mining altar

Even as the first settlements were established there were small finds tin, iron and copper.

But when, in 1168, rich silver finds were discovered in the area of Freiberg, it precipitated the First Berggeschrey. Upon hearing the news of rich silver deposits miners, traders, charcoal burners and vagabonds quickly poured into this, at that time, inhospitable area. "Where a man wants to look for ore, he is allowed to do so with rights" the Margrave of Meissen, owner of the rights to use the mountain (mining rights), had asserted to the settlers flooding into the area. In order to settle the miners, who mostly came from the Harz Mountains, they were exempt from the feudal obligations to their landlords and so were able to devote themselves entirely to their work. However they had to pay a direct tax in the form of a mining tithe (Bergzehnt) to their local lords.

== Second or Great Berggeschrey ==
Over the course of the centuries, the search for ore extended to the crests of the Ore Mountains. In 1470, three hundred years after the First Berggeschrey, rich silver ore deposits were discovered in Schneeberg and in 1491/92 on the Schreckenberg in present-day Annaberg-Buchholz. This news resulted in the Second Berggeschrey, which was also known as the Great Berggeschrey. Feverish mining activity and the associated influx of people from other regions spread to the whole Ore Mountains. By the end of the 15th century it was much more densely populated than hitherto. It was at that time that the mining towns of Jáchymov (Sankt Joachimsthal), Annaberg, Buchholz, Schneeberg and Marienberg emerged.

== Third Berggeschrei ==
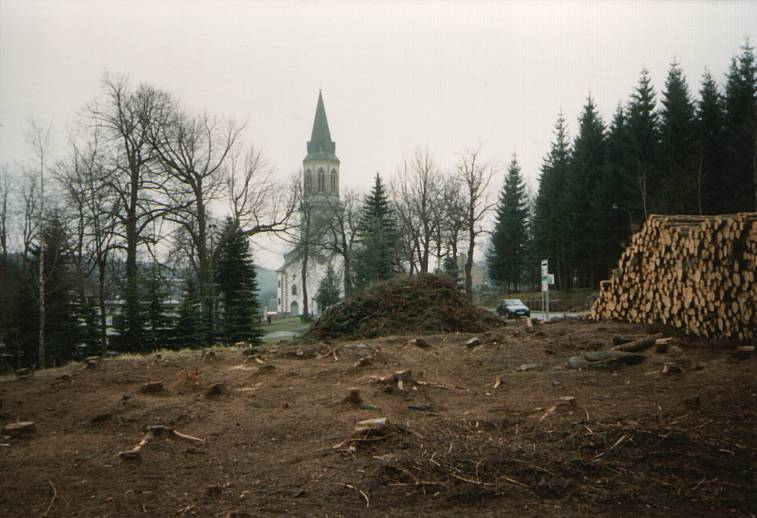
Parts of the Old Town of Johanngeorgenstadt had to be demolished and afforested in 1953 due to subsidence

In the post-war years from 1946 onwards, almost eight hundred years after the First Berggeschrey, activity comparable to the gold rush broke out again in the Ore Mountains as a result of uranium ore mining by the SDAG Wismut. This is nicknamed the Drittes Bergeschrei ("Third Bergeschrei"), using the modern German spelling of the word Bergeschrey. As a result of the rapid and reckless boom the population grew sharply in several places (see e. g. Johanngeorgenstadt). Especially in the early days of the Wismut mining operation considerable damage was done to the environment, historic village centres and infrastructure (e.g. spa house and facilities of the internationally renowned Schlema radium spa) were destroyed and there were serious health problems amongst the Wismut miners at the time.

Apart from silver and uranium, tin, iron, copper, arsenic, lead, cobalt, nickel, bismuth (Wismut), tungsten and zinc were mined in the Ore Mountains.

== Post German-reunification ==
After the political Wende mining operations by SDAG Wismut were shut down completely after 1990. It had been the largest employer and the most important economic factor in the region. Today, the pits of the lime works in the Lengefeld village of Kalkwerk represent the last working mine using mineshafts in the state of Saxony on the northern side of the Ore Mountains. The whole Ore Mountain Mining Region (Montanregion Erzgebirge) with its above-ground mining facilities, show mines, technical monuments, mining education paths and the traditions of local people are witnesses to these three key epochs in mining history.

Since 2019, the Ore Mountain Mining Region is a UNESCO World Heritage Site.

== Sources ==
- Siegfried Sieber (1954), Zur Geschichte des erzgebirgischen Bergbaues (in German), Halle (Saale): Wilhelm-Knapp-Verlag, p. 135
- Reschetilowski, Wladimir (2023). "Das sächsische "Berggeschrey" geht um die Welt". Nachrichten aus der Chemie 71(9):20-25 (in German).
