= Lengefeld Lime Works =

German underground limestone quarry

Coordinates: 50°42′1.29″N 13°10′14.36″E

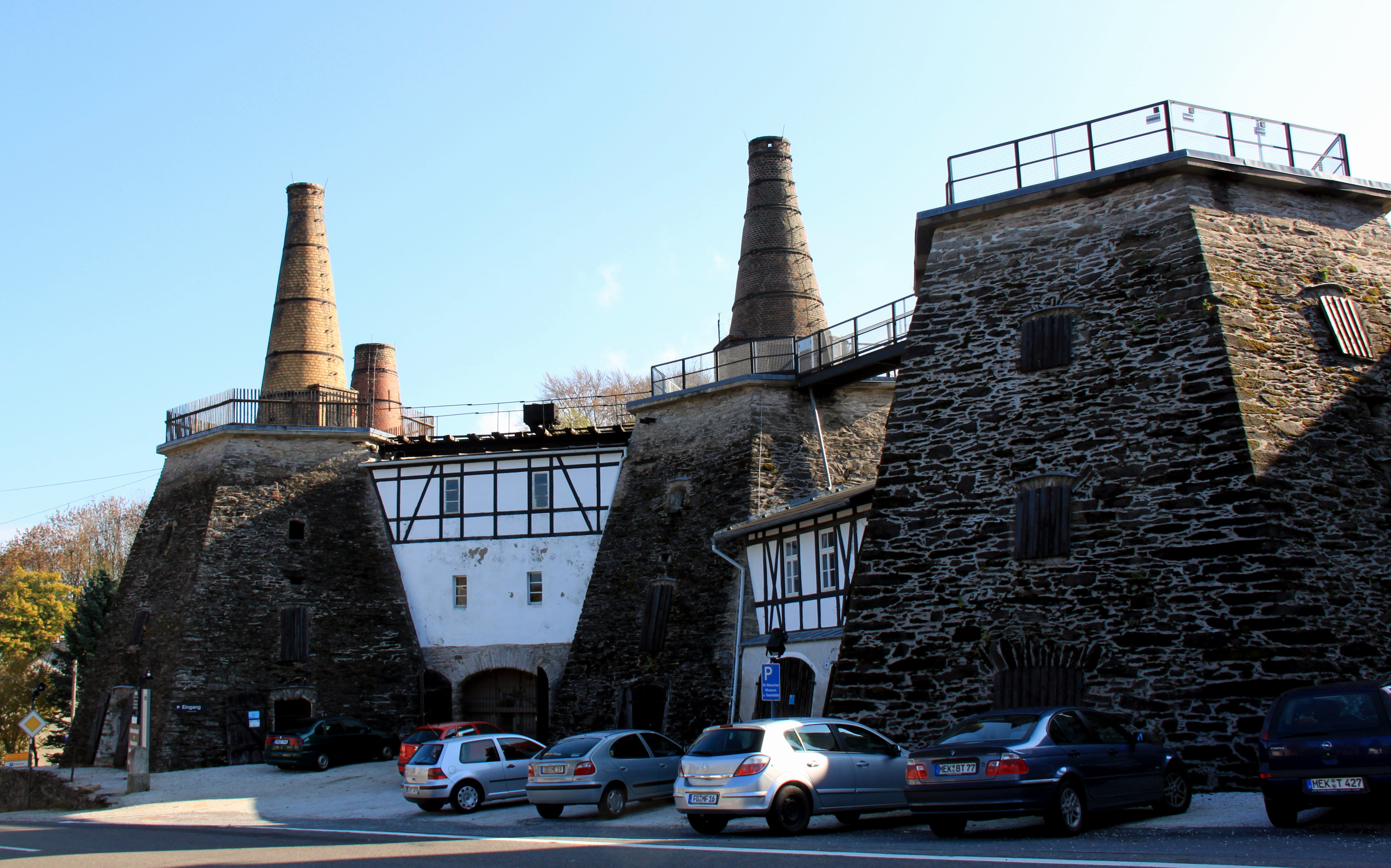
View of the historic open pit facilities of the lime works

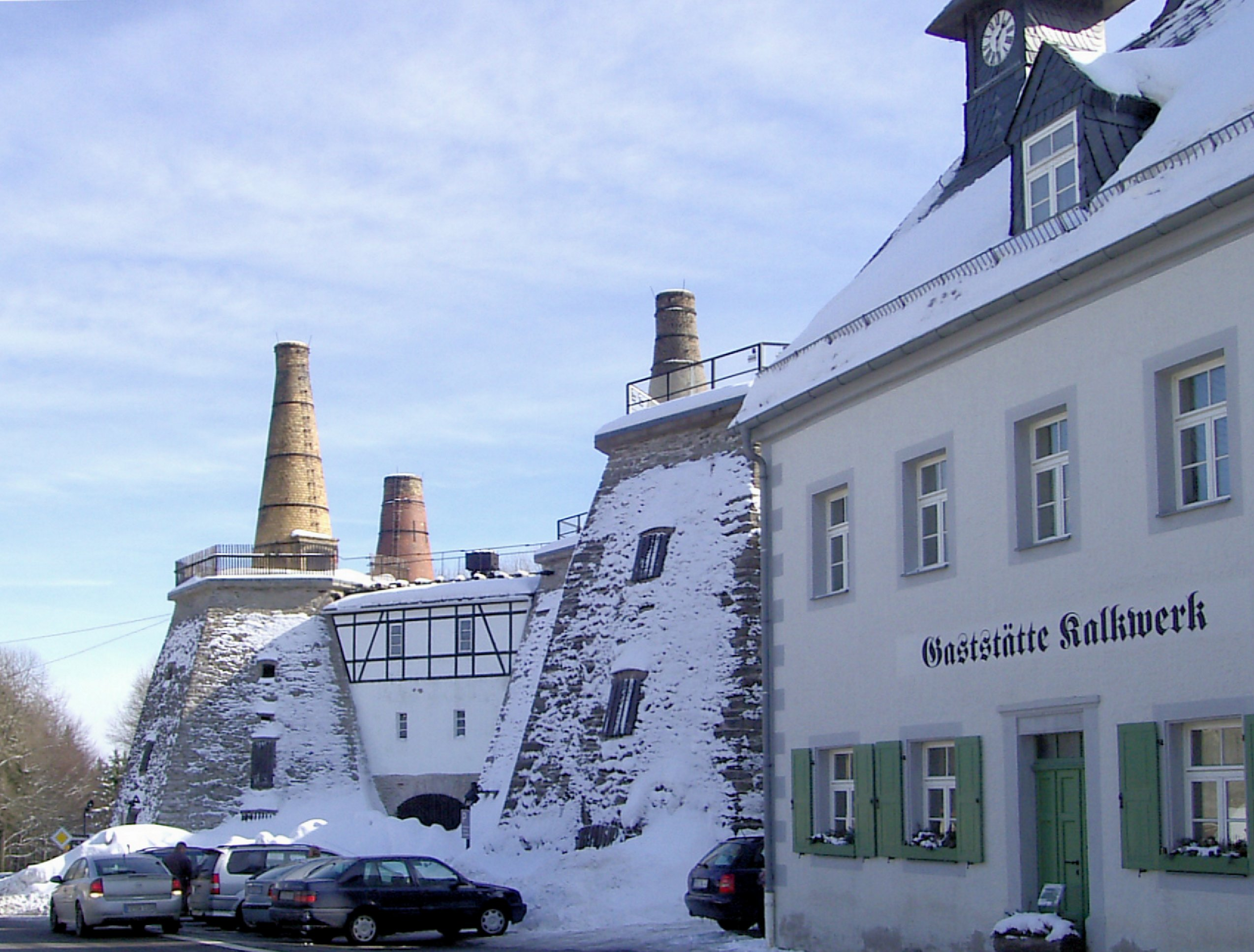
View of the historic open pit facilities of the lime works in winter

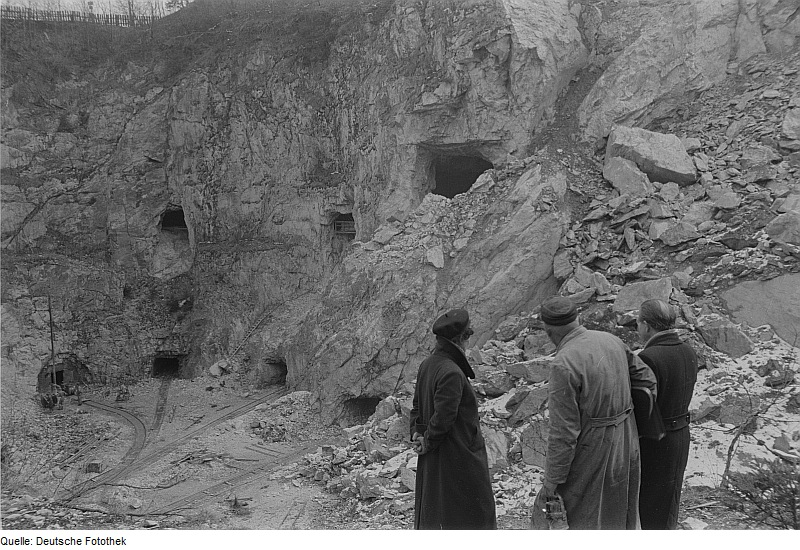
View into the open quarry (end of 1945) – part of the collection of the Old Masters Gallery in Dresden was stored in the stopes of the second level (2. Sohle) during the Second World War

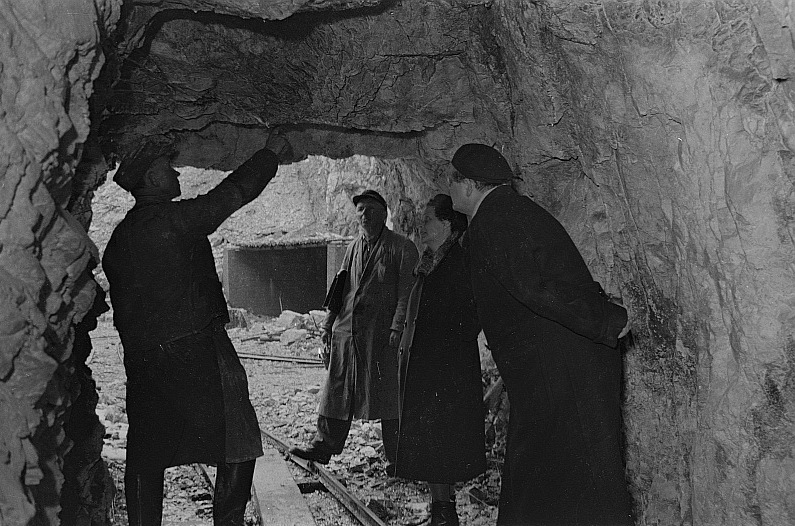
Gallery entrance in the bottom of the open quarry (end of 1945)

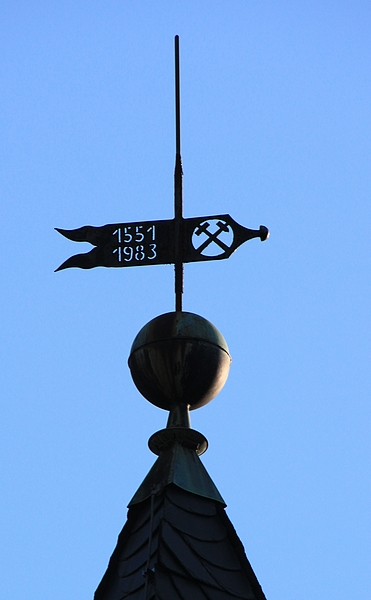
Weather vane on the restaurant, Gaststätte Kalkwerk, with the years "1551" and "1983" and the mining symbol of the hammer and pick

The Lengefeld Lime Works (German: Kalkwerk Lengefeld) was a limestone mine southwest of Lengefeld in the Saxon town of Pockau-Lengefeld in the Ore Mountains. In 2016, the mine was closed.

== Geology of the deposit ==
The Lengefeld deposit is located not far from the B 101 road, in the wood between the Heinzebank and Pockau. The only element of economic value is dolomitic marble, which is categorized lithostratigraphically as part of the Raschau Formation within the Keilberg Group. The material immediately surrounding the deposit comprises Lower Cambrian rock of the Raschau sequence, about 530 to 540 million years old. Feldspar-bearing muscovite mica-schist forms the basis of this sequence in which thin lenses of amphibolite are interspersed. The stratum of dolomitic marble has an average thickness of 50 to 90 metres. Host rocks include garnet-bearing and quartzitic muscovite mica-schist as well as interleaved strata of quartzite schist (Quarzitschiefer). As a result of the Variscan mountain building the once compact body of marble was split into five blocks known as the Altes Lager ("Old Deposit"), Neues Lager ("New Deposit), Tiefes Lager ("Deep Deposit"), Lößnitz-Lager ("Lößnitz Deposit") and Weißer Ofen ("White Kiln").

== History ==
The mining of lime from this deposit was first mentioned in a deed of enfeoffment dated 1528. This was a result of lease agreements or was a fiscal deed produced under the direction of the Royal Saxon Forestry Offices. In 1567, the existence of a quarry and two kilns is recorded in a deed of sale by the Barony of Rauenstein to Prince-Elector Augustus.

The rated quantity of lime produced per firing was 280 tons for one of the kilns, and 260 tons for the others. Lime from Lengefeld was used inter alia by the architect (Baumeister), Hans Irmisch, for the construction of Freudenstein Castle in Freiberg.

In the final years of the 17th century, the Scheibenberg pastor and chronicler, Christian Lehmann, praised the production of lime around Lengefeld:

"By the River Flöha and its tributaries lie 3 noble lime kilns around Lengefeld, which are highly valued, because every year up to 3, 4 or even more times 300 tons of lime can be burned and the value of a ton on the spot is 8 gr." (original text: „An der Flöhe und ihren Einfällen liegen 3 fürnehme Kalck-Ofen um Lengefeld, die hoch æstimirt werden, dieweil man alle Jahr daselbst zu 3, 4 und auch mehrmahlen iederzeit auf 300 Tonnen Kalck brennen kan, und gilt die Tonne auff der Stelle 8 gr.“)

In 2016, the company Geomin closed the mine, because the deposits are exhausted. The processing plant remains in operation for the other quarry of the company in Hammerunterwiesenthal.

== Literature ==
- Jutta Sachse: Technisches Denkmal Museum Kalkwerk Lengefeld: Technisches Denkmal der Bindemittelindustrie im europäischen Raum. Sächsische Landesstelle für Museumswesen, Chemnitz 2001.
- Siegfried Biedermann: 475 Jahre Kalkbergbau in Lengefeld 1582 bis 2003. Stadtverwaltung Lengefeld, Lengefeld, 2003.
- Wolfgang Schilka: Kalkwerk Lengefeld: 475 Jahre Marmorgewinnung aus der Lengefelder Lagerstätte. In: Erzgebirgische Heimatblätter 25. Jg., 3/2003, pp. 9–13. ISSN 0232-6078
- Lagerstätte Lengefeld/Erzgebirge. In: Marmore im Erzgebirge, Bergbau in Sachsen Band 16, Landesamt für Umwelt, Landwirtschaft und Geologie; Freiberg, 2010; pp. 81–89. (PDF 7,47 MB)
- Projektgruppe UNESCO-Welterbe Montanregion Erzgebirge: Umsetzungsstudie Kalkwerk Lengefeld. Freiberg, 2011. (PDF)
