= Rauenstein =

Rauenstein may refer to places, hills and castles in Germany:

Places:

- Rauenstein, a village in the municipality of Effelder-Rauenstein in Sonneberg District, Thuringia
- Rauenstein, a village in the borough of Lengefeld in Erzgebirgskreis District, Saxony

Hills

- Rauenstein (303.7 m), hill in Saxon Switzerland near Rathen, Sächsische Schweiz-Osterzgebirge District, Saxony
- Rauenstein (366.4 m), elevation with the Raue Steine rock formation in the Habichtswald Nature Park, Kassel District, North Hesse

Castles:

- Rauenstein Castle Ruins, ruins above Rauenstein in Effelder-Rauenstein, Sonneberg District, Thuringia
- Rauenstein Castle, palace-like former castle that gave its name to the village of Rauenstein in the borough of Lengefeld, Erzgebirgskreis District, Saxony
