= Lauterbacher Knochen =

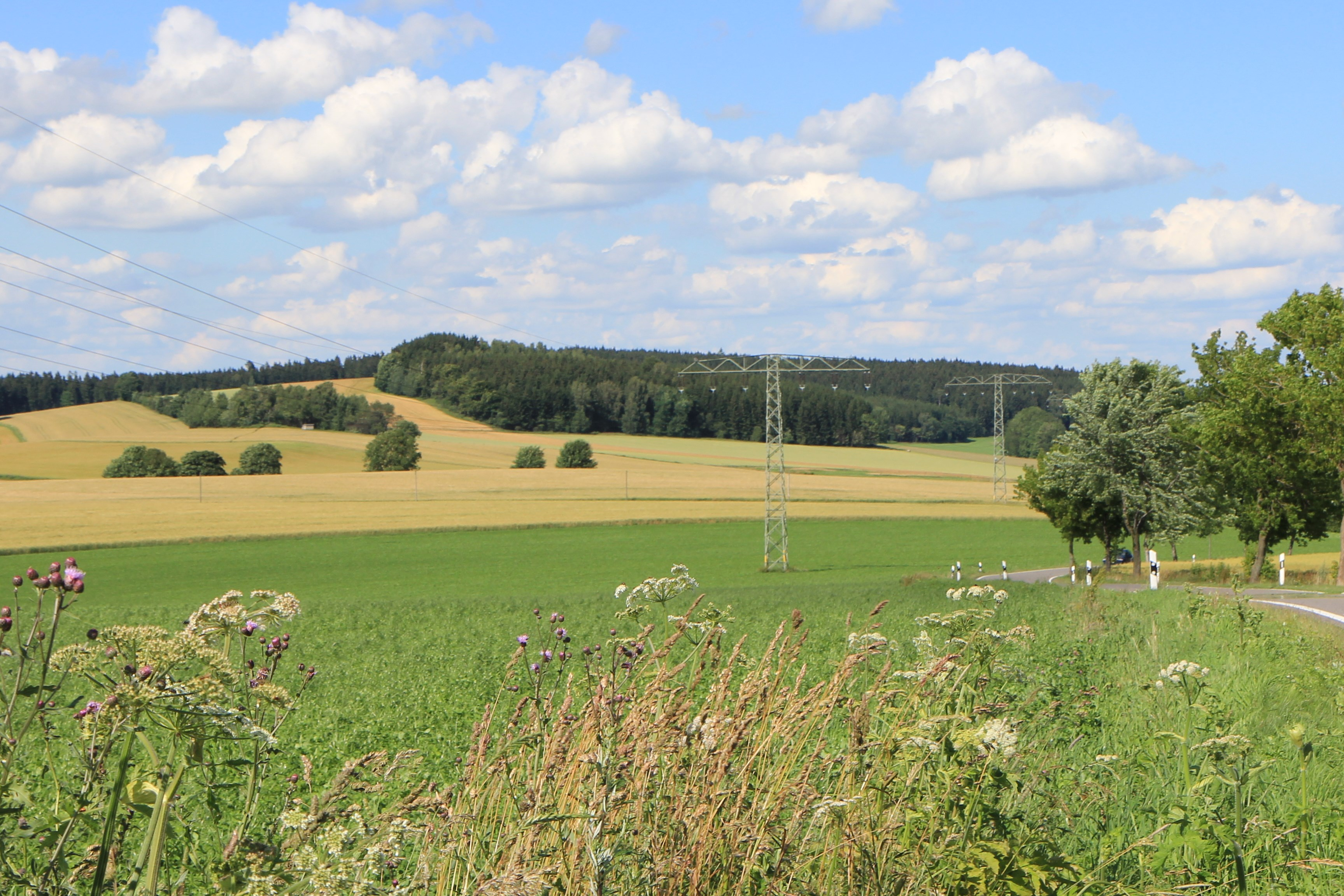
- Lauterbacher Knochen from the south

Highest point
- Elevation: 683 m (2,241 ft)
- Coordinates: 50°41′27″N 13°10′00″E

Geography
- Location within Saxony
- Location: Saxony (Germany)
- Parent range: Ore Mountains

The Lauterbacher Knochen is a 683-metre-high (2,241 ft) peak about one kilometre north of the village of Lauterbach in the municipality of Marienberg in the Ore Mountains. At the summit there is a historic station which was part of the Royal Saxon Triangulation Network.

== Location ==
Together with the Dreibrüderhöhe the ridge forms the watershed between the rivers Zschopau and Flöha on the borders of the Marienberg Plateau.

== Views ==
Despite its modest height it offers a panoramic view. To the northwest the Waltersdorf Heights are visible. To the east is the mining town of Sayda and the Schwartenberg. To the south the Annahöhe, the Steinhübel, the Hirtstein and the Dreibrüderhöhe may be made out. To the southwest is the Pöhlberg, and on the horizon the Fichtelberg and Keilberg can be recognised. The Adlerstein is also nearby.
