= Erzgebirge 5 =

State electoral district of Germany

16: Erzgebirge 5
- Electoral district for the Landtag of Saxony
- Erzgebirge 5 in 2024
- District: Erzgebirgskreis
- Electorate: 56,844 (2024)
- Major settlements: Marienberg, Olbernhau, Pockau-Lengefeld, Wolkenstein, and Zschopau

Current electoral district
- Party: AfD
- Member: Arthur Österle

Erzgebirge 5 is an electoral constituency (German: Wahlkreis) represented in the Landtag of Saxony. It elects one member via first-past-the-post voting. Under the constituency numbering system, it is designated as constituency 16. It is within the district of Erzgebirgskreis.

== Geography ==
The constituency comprises the towns of Marienberg, Olbernhau, Pockau-Lengefeld, Wolkenstein, and Zschopau, and the districts of Börnichen, Deutschneudorf, Drebach, Gornau, Großolbersdorf, Großrückerswalde, Grünhainichen, Heidersdorf, and Seiffen within Erzgebirgskreis.

There were 56,844 eligible voters in 2024.

== Members ==
Election	Member	Party	%
2014	Günther Schneider	CDU	46.8
2019	Jörg Markert	CDU	34.6
2024	Arthur Österle	AfD	38.3

== Election results ==
=== 2024 election ===
State election (2024): Erzgebirge 5
Notes:	Blue background denotes the winner of the electorate vote. Pink background denotes a candidate elected from their party list. Yellow background denotes an electorate win by a list member, or other incumbent. A ✓ or ✗ denotes status of any incumbent, win or lose respectively.						
Party	Candidate	Votes	%	±%	Party votes	%	±%
AfD	Arthur Österle	16,191	38.3	▲6.4	15,132	35.7	▲4.3
CDU	✗ Jörg Olaf Markert	13,177	31.2	▼3.4	14,260	33.6	▼2.6
BSW	János Füleki	3,984	9.4		5,465	12.9	
FDP	Heinz-Peter Haustein	2,880	6.8	▲0.3	484	1.1	▼3.5
FW	G. Karlhermann Schneider	2,463	5.8	▲1.0	1,160	2.7	▼0.5
SPD	Andreas Enrico Haustein	2,164	5.1	▼1.5	1,889	4.5	▼2.6
Freie Sachsen					1,407	3.3	
Left	Andreas Heilsberg	928	2.2	▼7.9	771	1.8	▼7.0
Greens	S. Rudolf Walter	457	1.1	▼4.3	600	1.4	▼2.2
APT					377	0.9	
PARTEI					213	0.5	▼0.5
Bündnis C					203	0.5	
Values					130	0.3	
BD					106	0.3	
Pirates					54	0.1	
dieBasis					48	0.1	
V-Partei3					47	0.1	
BüSo					30	0.1	
ÖDP					22	0.1	
Informal votes		715			561		
Total valid votes		42,244			42,398		
Turnout		42,959	75.6	▲5.4			
AfD gain from CDU	Majority	3,014	7.1				

=== 2019 election ===
State election (2019): Erzgebirge 5
Notes:	Blue background denotes the winner of the electorate vote. Pink background denotes a candidate elected from their party list. Yellow background denotes an electorate win by a list member, or other incumbent. A ✓ or ✗ denotes status of any incumbent, win or lose respectively.						
Party	Candidate	Votes	%	±%	Party votes	%	±%
CDU	Jörg Markert	13,852	34.6	▼12.2	14,534	36.2	▼8.9
AfD	Torsten Gahler	12,798	32.0	▲22.4	12,598	31.4	▲20.9
Left	Kathleen Noack	4,046	10.1	▼7.7	3,527	8.8	▼8.4
SPD	Richard Ringeis	2,664	6.7	▼2.7	2,836	7.1	▼3.1
FDP	Tino Günther	2,598	6.5	▲0.6	1,859	4.6	▼0.7
Greens	Kay Meister	2,151	5.4	▲1.9	1,464	3.6	▲0.7
FW	Marc Schawn	1,945	4.9	▲3.4	1,284	3.2	▲2.0
APT					575	1.4	▲0.4
PARTEI					421	1.0	▲0.7
NPD					309	0.8	▼4.4
Verjüngungsforschung					244	0.6	
The Blue Party					128	0.3	
ÖDP					84	0.2	
Pirates					71	0.2	▼0.4
Awakening of German Patriots - Central Germany					68	0.2	
PDV					52	0.1	
DKP					41	0.1	
Humanists					35	0.1	
BüSo					30	0.1	Steady
Informal votes		722			616		
Total valid votes		40,054			40,160		
Turnout		40,776	67.8	▲15.7			
CDU hold	Majority	1,054	2.6	▼26.4			

=== 2014 election ===
State election (2014): Erzgebirge 5
Notes:	Blue background denotes the winner of the electorate vote. Pink background denotes a candidate elected from their party list. Yellow background denotes an electorate win by a list member, or other incumbent. A ✓ or ✗ denotes status of any incumbent, win or lose respectively.						
Party	Candidate	Votes	%	±%	Party votes	%	±%
CDU	Günther Schneider	15,180	46.8		14,686	45.1	
Left		5,770	17.8		5,589	17.2	
AfD		3,125	9.6		3,404	10.5	
SPD		3,044	9.4		3,320	10.2	
FDP		1,908	5.9		1,733	5.3	
NPD		1,483	4.6		1,678	5.2	
Greens		1,151	3.5		955	2.9	
FW		502	1.5		396	1.2	
APT					319	1.0	
Pirates		265	0.8		211	0.6	
PARTEI					105	0.3	
DSU					54	0.2	
Pro Germany Citizens' Movement					51	0.2	
BüSo					27	0.1	
Informal votes		673			573		
Total valid votes		32,428			32,528		
Turnout		33,101	52.1	▼12.5			
CDU win new seat	Majority	9,450	29.0				

== See also ==
- Politics of Saxony
- Landtag of Saxony
