= Oswald Bieber =

German architect (1874–1955)

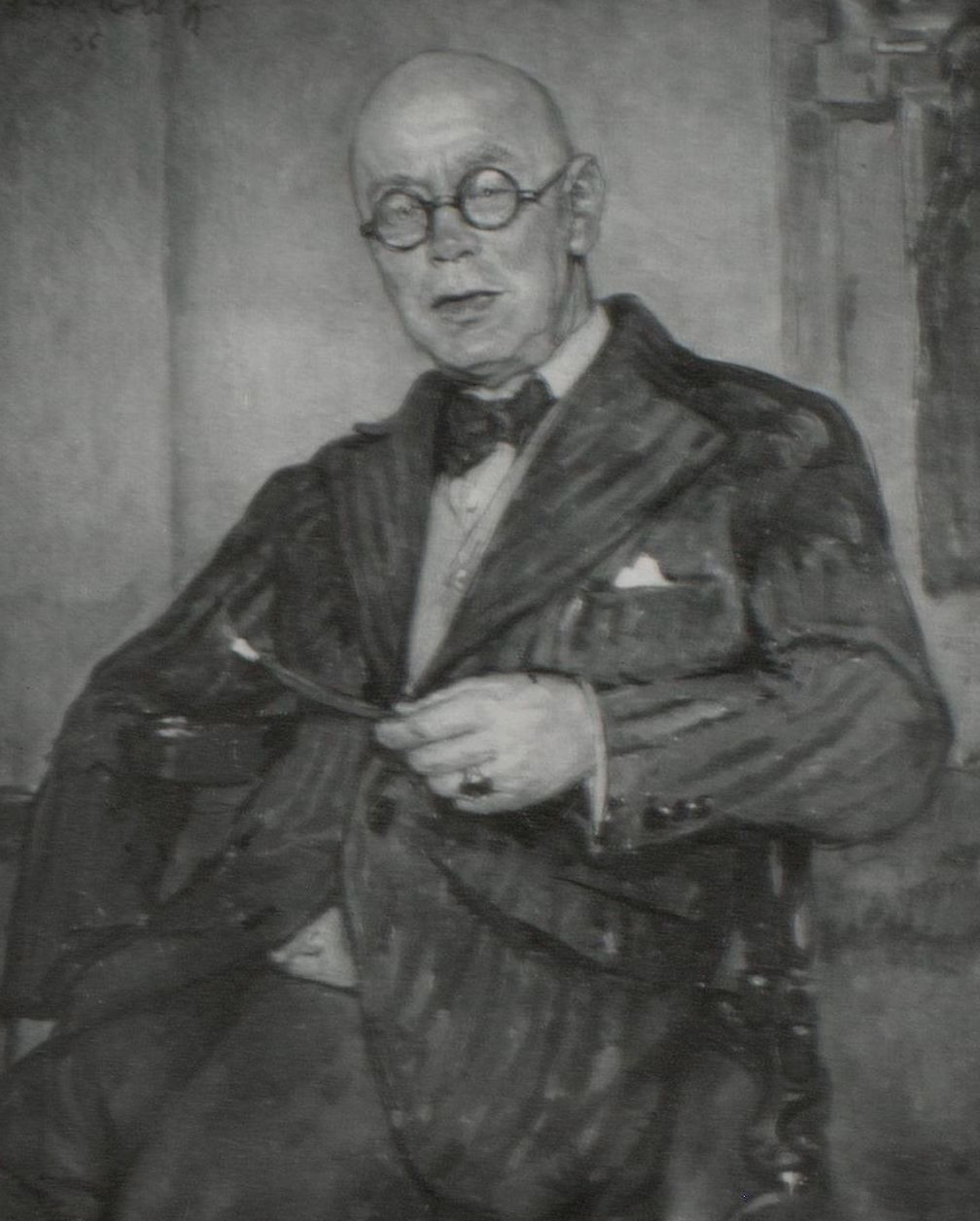
- Born: Oswald Eduard Bieber; 6 September 1874; Pockau, Germany
- Died: 31 August 1955 (aged 80); Munich, Germany
- Occupation: Architect

Oswald Eduard Bieber (6 September 1874 – 31 August 1955) was a German architect.

== Biography ==
Oswald Bieber was born in Pockau, the son of a carpenter. While attending the Baugewerkschule (building trade school) in Chemnitz, he also held an apprenticeship in the building trade. He received further training from his older brother, architect Ernst Louis Bieber.

From 1897 to 1900, Bieber worked in the architectural office of Schilling & Graebner in Dresden. In 1900, he moved to Munich and worked at the city building office under Hans Grässel for six years. During this time, he also took part in numerous architectural competitions. From 1906 to 1911, he was an artistic assistant in Georg Meister's office in Munich.

Bieber started his own architectural office, Bieber und Hollweck, together with Wilhelm Hollweck in 1911. This partnership would last until 1930.
