= Steinhübel (Saxony) =

Coordinates: 50°36′54″N 13°16′23″E

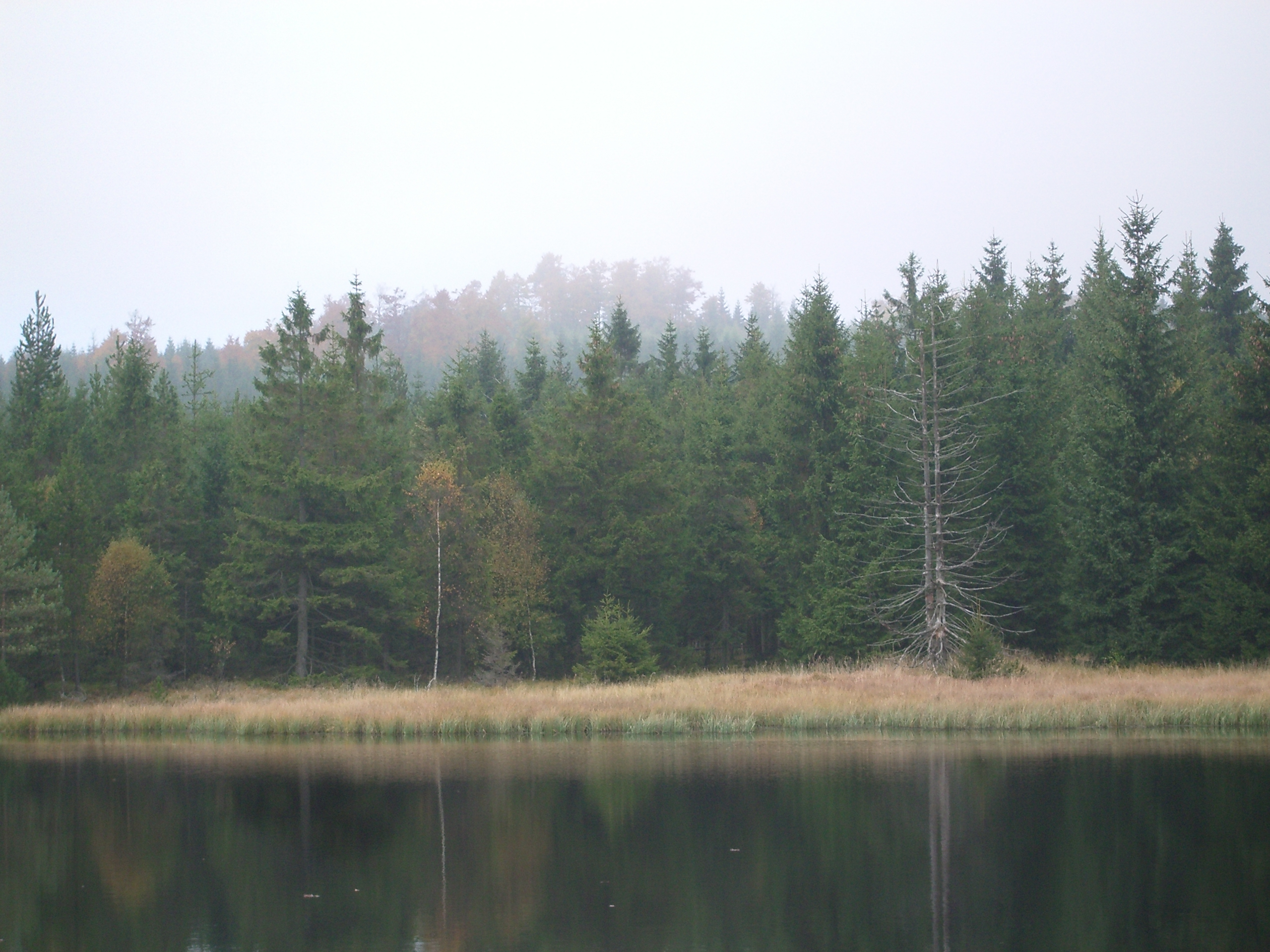
- View of Steinhübel.

Highest point
- Elevation: 816 m (2,677 ft)

Geography
- Location: Saxony, Germany

Steinhübel is a mountain of Saxony, southeastern Germany.
