= Dittersdorfer Höhe =

Coordinates: 50°46′N 12°59′E

Highest point
- Elevation: 553.5 m (1,816 ft)

Geography
- Location: Saxony, Germany

Dittersdorfer Höhe is an elevation in Amtsberg, in the state of Saxony, Germany. The hill has an elevation of 553 meters (1,816 feet) and features a country inn. Dittersdorfer Höhe is the highest point in Amtsberg.
