= Schwartenberg =

Coordinates: 50°39′25″N 13°28′06″E

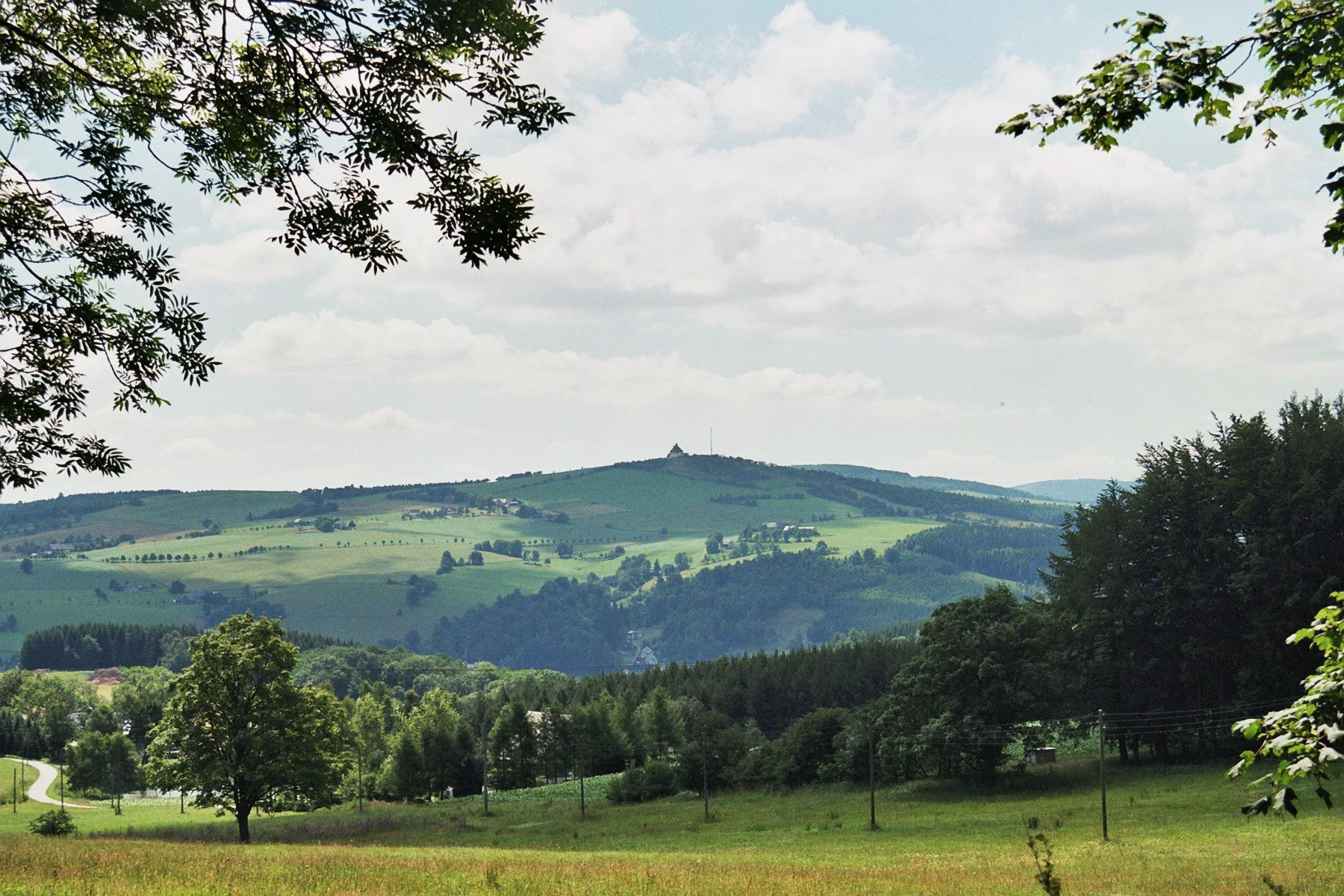
- View of the Schwartenberg.

Highest point
- Elevation: 789 m (2,589 ft)

Geography
- Location: Saxony, Germany

Schwartenberg is a mountain in Germany. It is located in the federal state of Saxony, in the eastern part of the country, approximately 210 km south of Berlin, the national capital. Schwartenberg has an elevation of 789 metres above sea level, or about 110 metres above the surrounding terrain. The base of the mountain is approximately 2.8 kilometres in diameter.

The landscape surrounding Schwartenberg is hilly to the southeast, while the area to the northwest is relatively flat. The highest point in the surrounding region has an elevation of 873 metres, located about 5.0 kilometres east of Schwartenberg. The nearest larger town is Olbernhau, situated 8.7 kilometres west of the mountain. Forests and hill formations are relatively common in the region surrounding Schwartenberg.

The area around Schwartenberg is almost entirely covered by mixed forest.The surrounding region has a population density of approximately 96 inhabitants per square kilometre, which is relatively moderate. The climate is classified as boreal. The average annual temperature is about 5 °C, with July being the warmest month at 16 °C, and December the coldest at −8 °C.
