= Keilberg =

Mountain in Germany

Keilberg (Schneeberg)
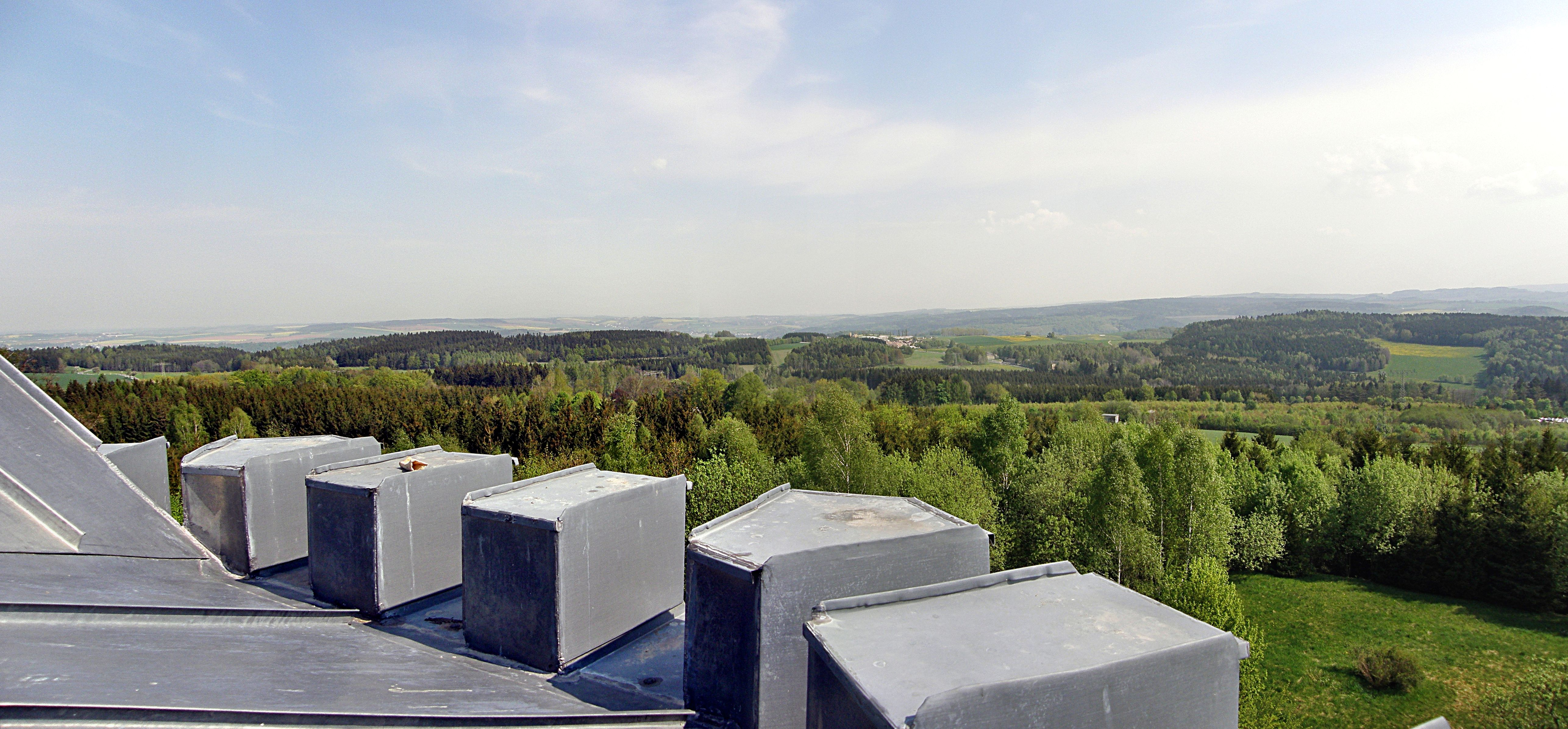

Highest point
- Elevation: 559 m (1,834 ft)
- Coordinates: 50°36′49″N 12°37′48″E

Geography
- Location: Saxony, Germany
- Parent range: Schneeberg, Saxony

Keilberg (Schneeberg) is a mountain in West-Erzgebirge of Saxony, southeastern Germany, nearby the town Schneeberg.

On its top stands a 21 meter high tower and a gastronomic house. Both buildings were erected in the end of 19th century.

== Literature ==
- Reinhart Heppner und Jörg Brückner: Sächsisch-böhmische Aussichtsberge des westlichen Erzgebirges in Wort und Bild mit touristischen Angaben. Horb am Neckar 2001, S. 42–43.
