= Rauenstein Castle =

Castle in Pockau-Lengefeld, Erzgebirge, Saxony, Germany

Coordinates: 50°43′44.50″N 13°12′03.50″E

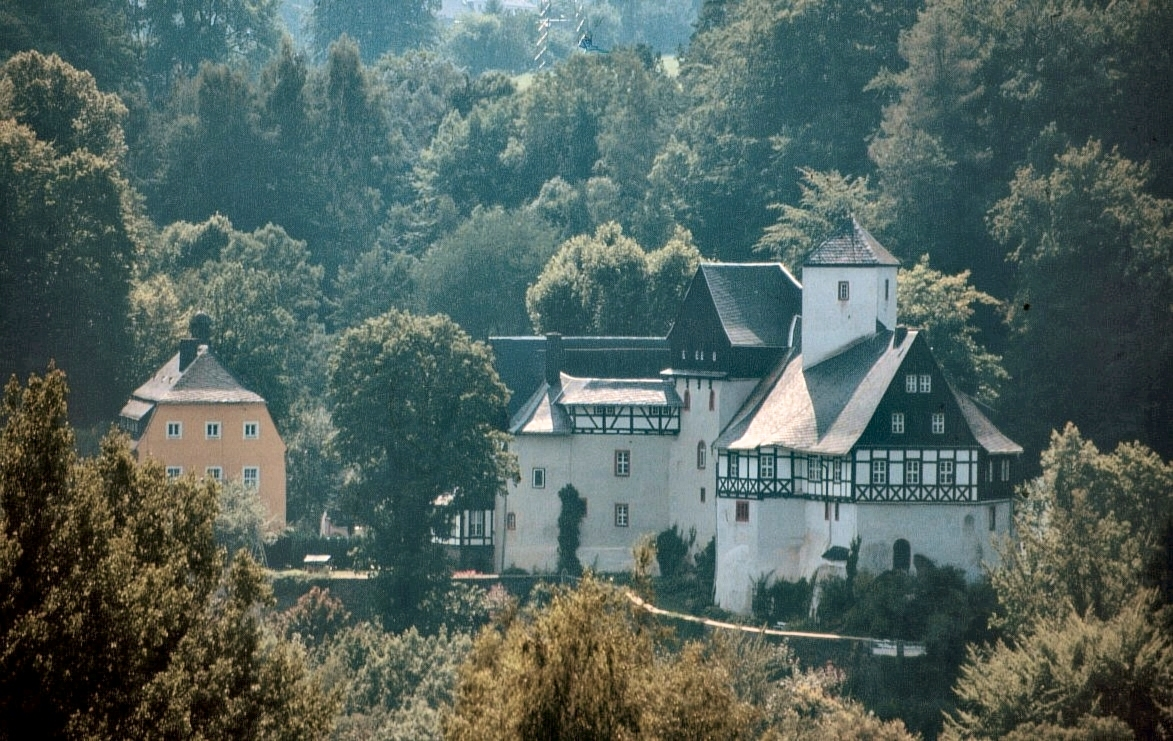
Rauenstein Castle from the opposite side of the valley

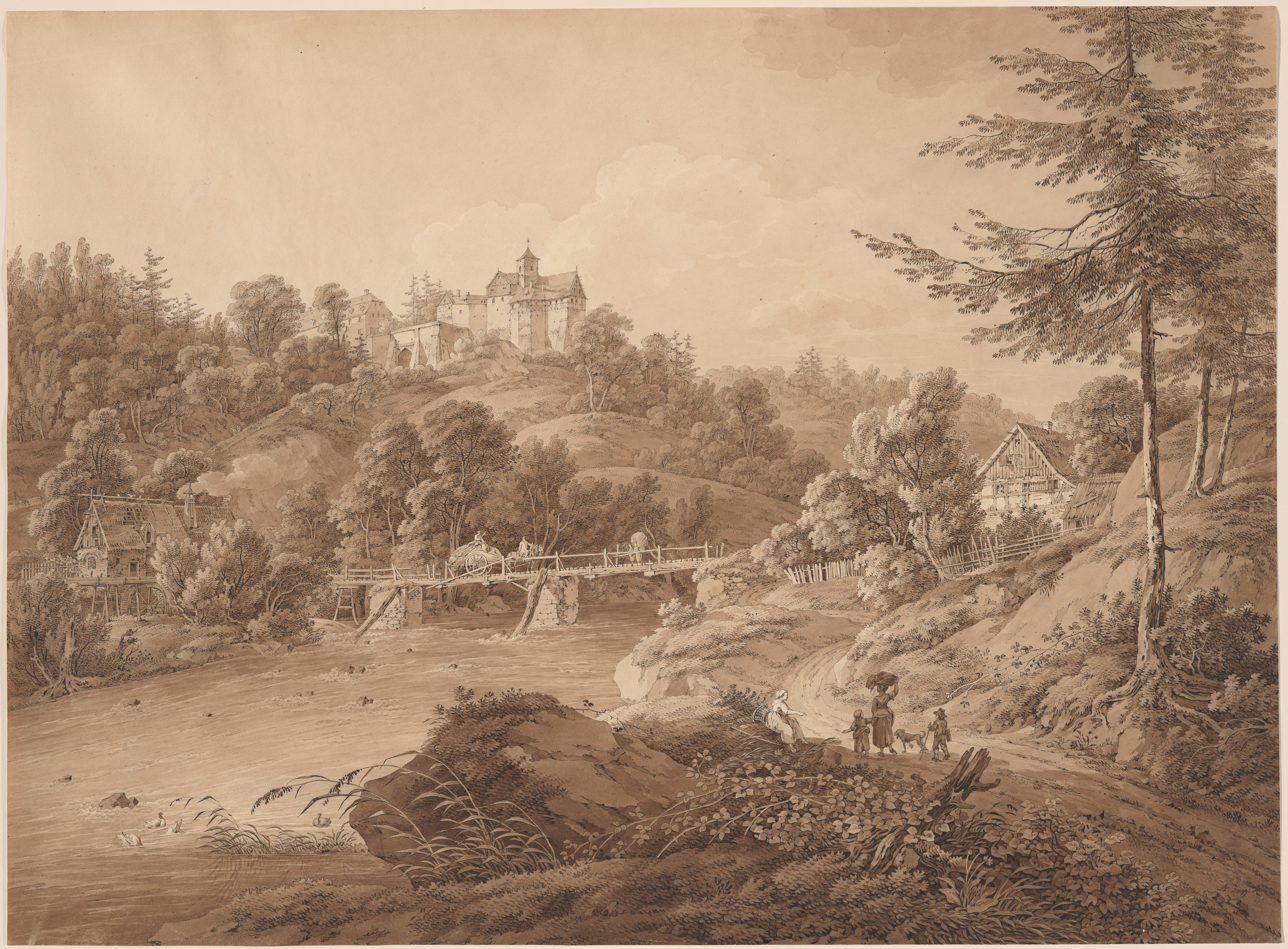
Adrian Zingg, Rauenstein Castle Seen from the River's Edge, c. 1800. Pen and brown ink and brown wash on wove paper; overall size: 50.2 × 68.3 cm (19 3/4 × 26 7/8 inches.) National Gallery of Art, Washington. Ailsa Mellon Bruce Fund, 1991.126.1

Rauenstein Castle (German: Schloss Rauenstein) is a castle in the village of Rauenstein in the town of Pockau-Lengefeld in the Ore Mountains of Central Europe. The castle guarded the crossing over the River Flöha along the road from Freiberg to Annaberg.

== History ==
The castle is first mentioned in 1323, although from archaeological investigations it is postulated that it had been built by around 1200. The first lords of Rauenstein were the Schellenbergers. After several changes of ruler, the castle went into the possession of the Electorate of Saxony in 1567. The Amt of Rauenstein was given to Wolkenstein in 1596. Around 1630 large structural changes were made. The road tunnel also dates to this time. From 1651 to 1743 the castle was rented to the von Römer family, who had become very wealthy as a result of silver mining in the Schneeberg area. Its owner, Christian August Hähnel, who had bought Rauenstein in 1816, his nephew, Wolfgang, Freiherr von Herder (owner from 1843 to 1853) and another family member, Wilhelm Freiherr von Herder, were members of the Saxon Landtag. The next owner, Gottfried Freiherr von Herder, was a German Conservative Reichstag MP from 1893 to 1898. After its confiscation as part of the land reform in the Soviet Zone of Occupation in 1945, the castle was used as a children's convalescent home. It has been owned by a private family since 1998 and may now only be viewed from the outside.

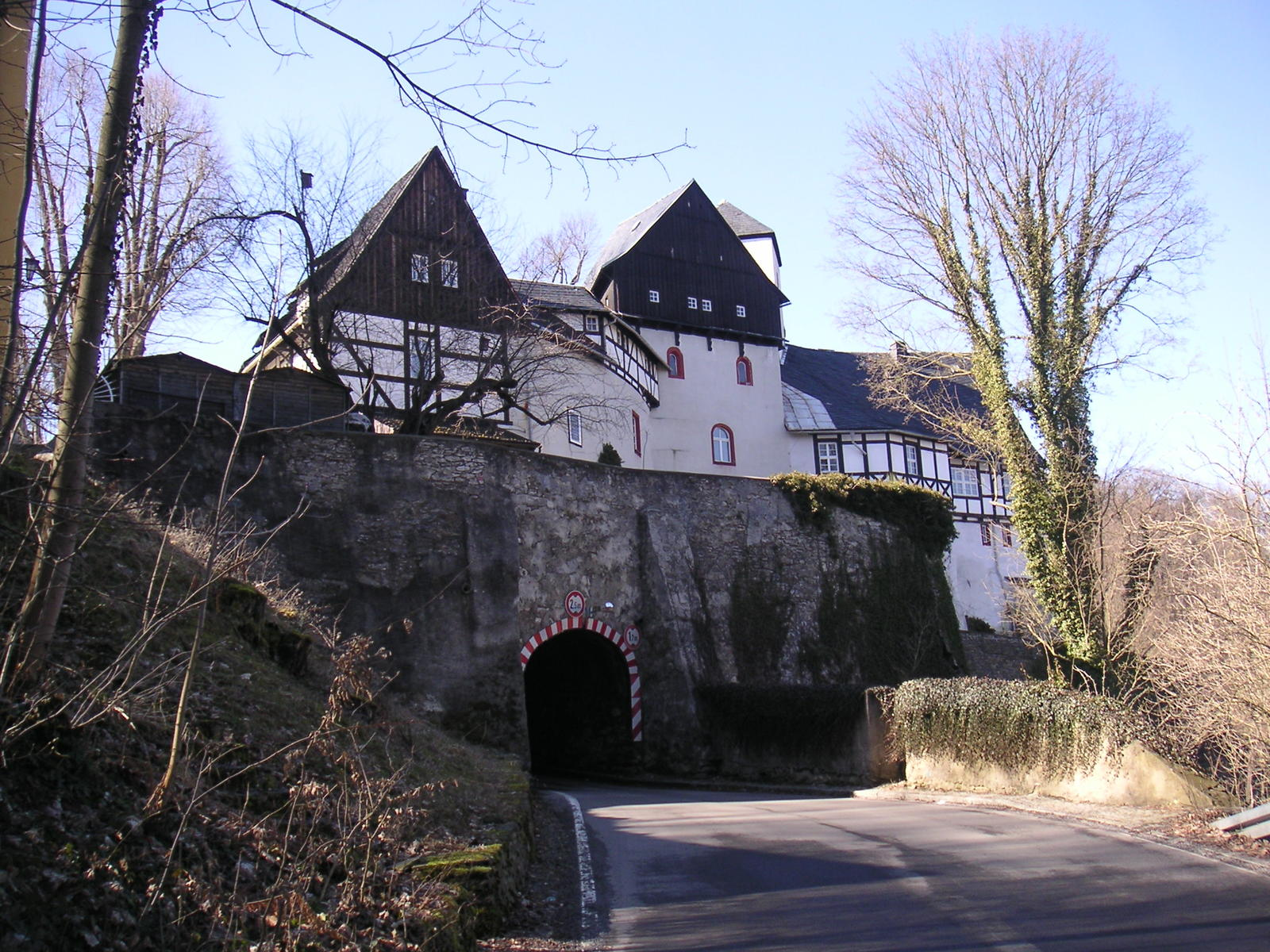
East face

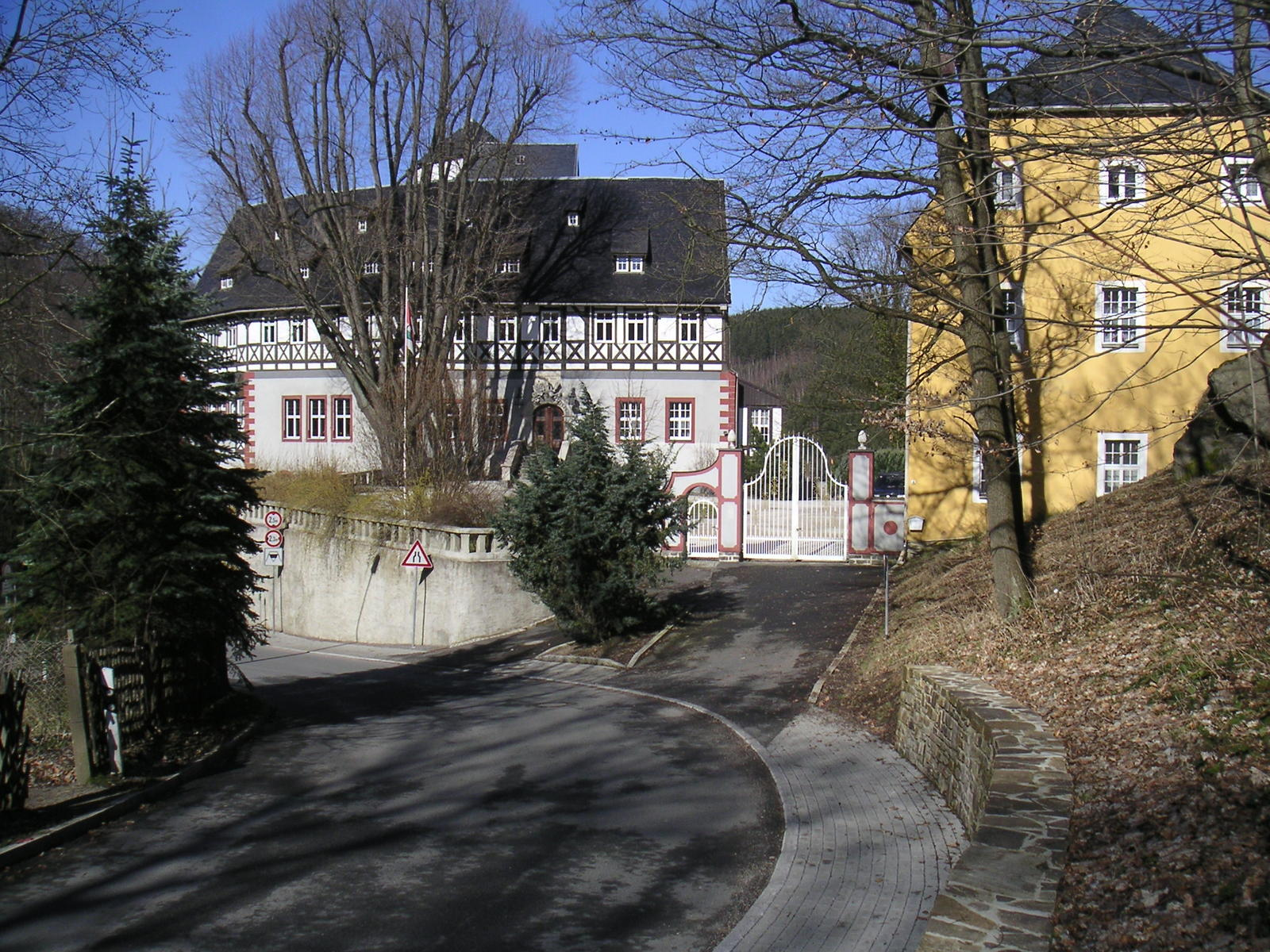
West face

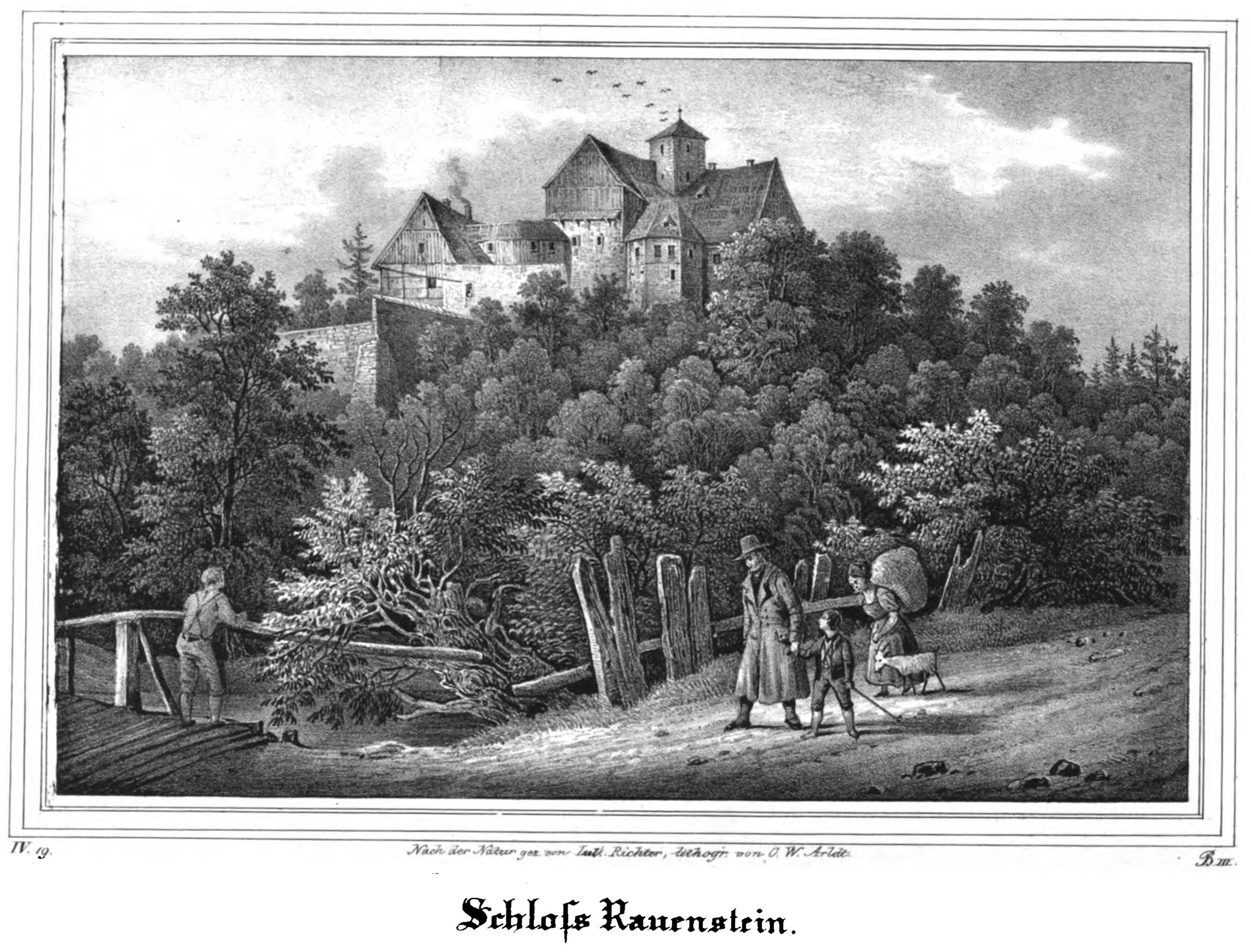
An 1839 lithograph

== Sources ==
- Schumann, August (1821). "Rauenstein". Vollständiges Staats-, Post- und Zeitungslexikon von Sachsen (in German). Vol. 8. Zwickau. p. 790.
