= Pockau =

- Ortsteil of Pockau-Lengefeld
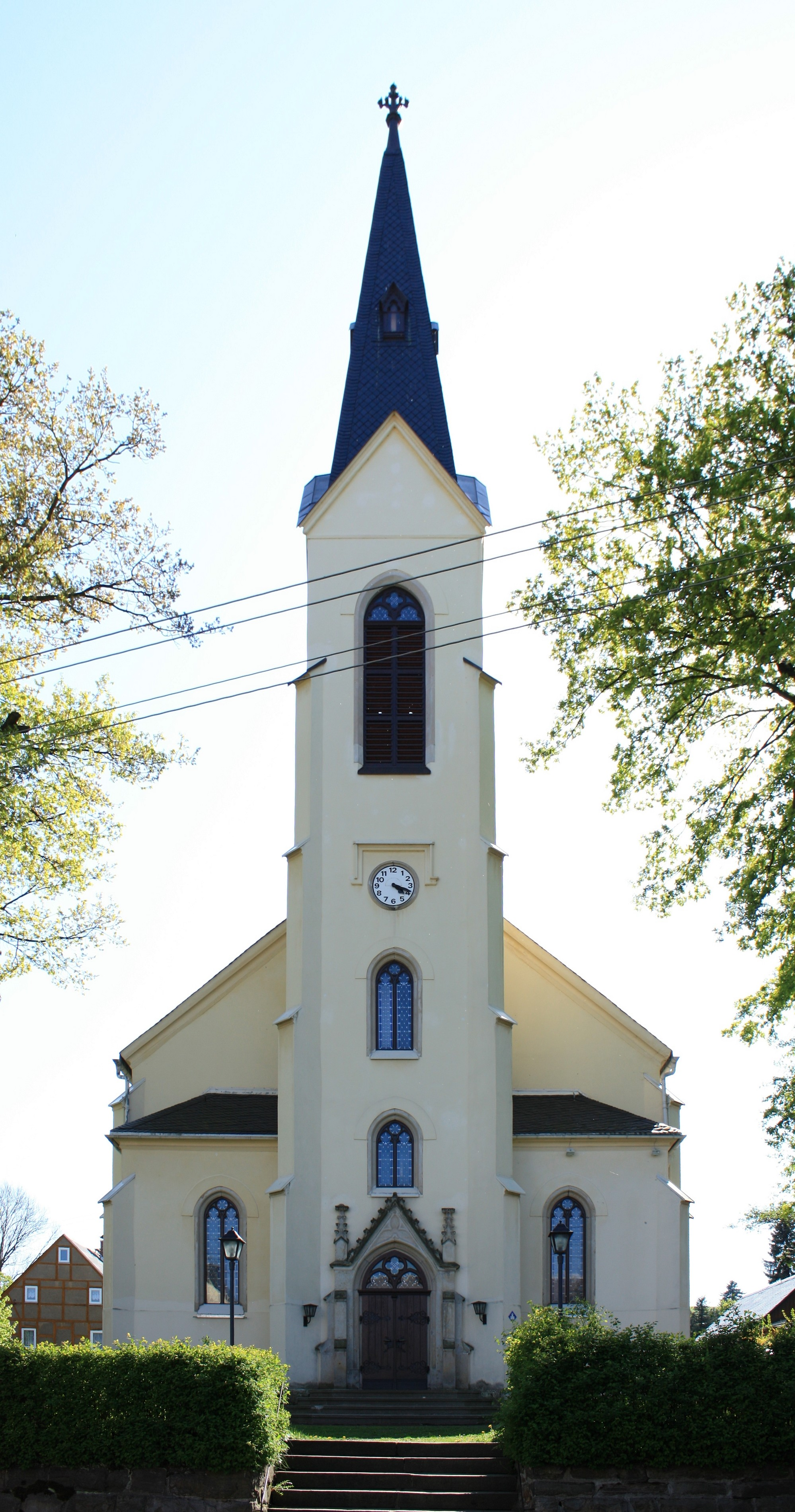
- Church

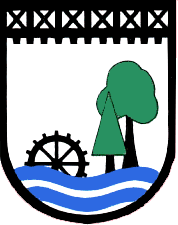
- Coat of arms
- Interactive map of Pockau
- Location within Germany Location within Saxony
- Coordinates: 50°42′N 13°13′E
- Country: Germany
- State: Saxony
- District: Erzgebirgskreis
- Town: Pockau-Lengefeld

Area
  - Total: 36.04 km^{2} (13.92 sq mi)
- Elevation: 428 m (1,404 ft)

Population (2012-12-31)
  - Total: 3,867
  - Density: 107.3/km^{2} (277.9/sq mi)
- Time zone: UTC+01:00 (CET)
  - Summer (DST): UTC+02:00 (CEST)
- Postal codes: 09509
- Dialling codes: 037367
- Vehicle registration: ERZ
- Website: www.pockau.de

Pockau (German pronunciation: [ˈpɔkaʊ]) is a village and a former municipality in the district of Erzgebirgskreis in Saxony, Germany. On 1 January 2014 it was merged with the town Lengefeld to form the town Pockau-Lengefeld. Pockau is on the Silver Road (Silberstraße).

== Geography ==
Originally a forest village (Waldhufendorf), Pockau is located in the valley of the Flöha at its confluence with the Black Pockau. To the north lie the one-time forest villages of Görsdorf und Forchheim, the latter in the valley of the Haselbach. To the east, in the Flöha valley, lie Wernsdorf and the settlement of Nennigmühle. To the west is the settlement of Marterbüschel. The highest point in the former municipality of Pockau is the Brandhübel, at a height of 610 metres (2,000 ft); the lowest point is the Flöha valley at around 400 metres (1,300 ft). The Saidenbach Dam is northeast of Pockau.

== Subdivisions ==
- Forchheim
- Görsdorf
- Nennigmühle
- Wernsdorf
- Marterbüschel
