= Pockau-Lengefeld =

Place in town in Erzgebirgskreis, Saxony, Germany

- Town
- Coat of arms

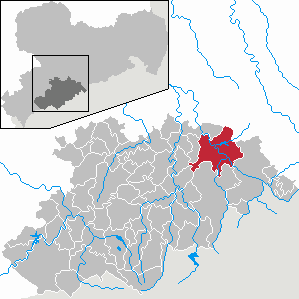
- Location of Pockau-Lengefeld within Erzgebirgskreis district
- Interactive map of Pockau-Lengefeld
- Location within Germany Location within Saxony
- Coordinates: 50°43′N 13°11′E
- Country: Germany
- State: Saxony
- District: Erzgebirgskreis

Government
  - Mayor (2023–30): Elke Schmieder

Area
  - Total: 83.43 km^{2} (32.21 sq mi)
- Elevation: 440 m (1,440 ft)

Population (2025-12-31)
  - Total: 7,197
  - Density: 86.26/km^{2} (223.4/sq mi)
- Time zone: UTC+01:00 (CET)
  - Summer (DST): UTC+02:00 (CEST)
- Postal codes: 09509, 09514
- Dialling codes: 037367
- Vehicle registration: ERZ, ANA, ASZ, AU, MAB, MEK, STL, SZB, ZP
- Website: pockau-lengefeld.de

Pockau-Lengefeld (German pronunciation: [ˈpɔkaʊ ˈlɛŋəˌfɛlt]) is a town in the district Erzgebirgskreis, in Saxony, Germany. It is situated in the Ore Mountains, 23 km southeast of Chemnitz. It was formed by the merger of the municipality Pockau and the town Lengefeld on 1 January 2014.
