= Lengefeld =

- Ortsteil of Pockau-Lengefeld
- Coat of arms
- Interactive map of Lengefeld
- Location within Germany Location within Saxony
- Coordinates: 50°43′N 13°11′E
- Country: Germany
- State: Saxony
- District: Erzgebirgskreis
- Town: Pockau-Lengefeld

Area
  - Total: 47.52 km^{2} (18.35 sq mi)
- Elevation: 440 m (1,440 ft)

Population (2012-12-31)
  - Total: 4,290
  - Density: 90.3/km^{2} (234/sq mi)
- Time zone: UTC+01:00 (CET)
  - Summer (DST): UTC+02:00 (CEST)
- Postal codes: 09514
- Dialling codes: 037367
- Vehicle registration: ERZ
- Website: lengefeld.de

Lengefeld (German pronunciation: [ˈlɛŋəˌfɛlt]) is a town and a former municipality in the district Erzgebirgskreis, in the Free State of Saxony, Germany. It is situated in the Ore Mountains, 23 km southeast of Chemnitz. On 1 January 2014 it was merged with the municipality Pockau to form the town Pockau-Lengefeld.

== Sights ==
- Lengefeld Lime Works Museum
