= Feigenbaumklippe =

Coordinates: 51°51′49.60″N 10°28′50.52″E

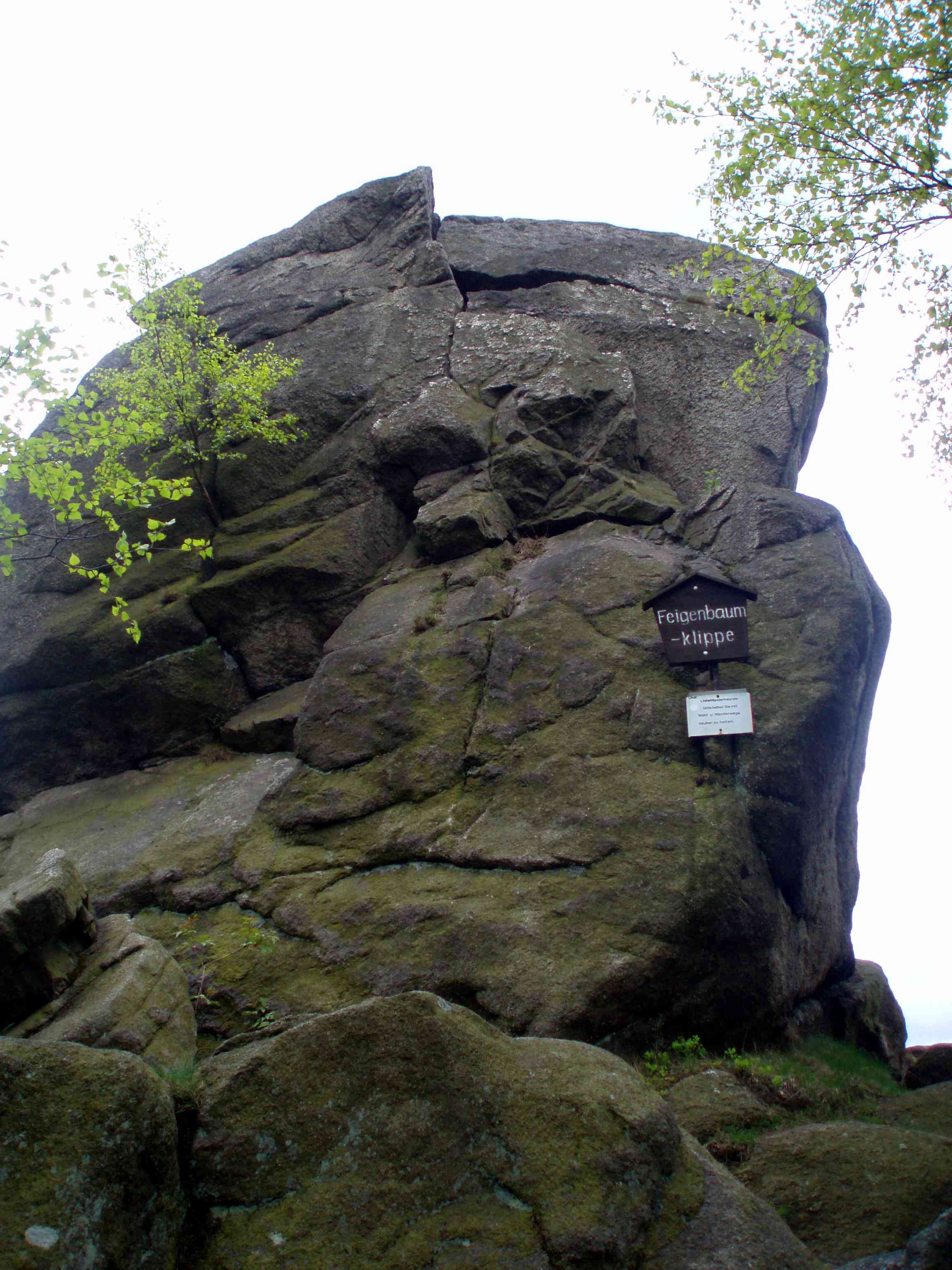
The Feigenbaumklippe

The Feigenbaumklippe is a rock formation in the Oker valley in the Harz mountains of central Germany. They lie on the hiking trail from the Kästeklippen crags to Romkerhall Waterfall. These granite rocks, which show clear signs of "woolsack weathering" (Wollsackverwitterung) are a favorite destination for hikers and offer a good view of the valley towards the west. The observation point has safety railings.
