= Kästeklippen =

Coordinates: 51°52′06″N 10°29′00″E

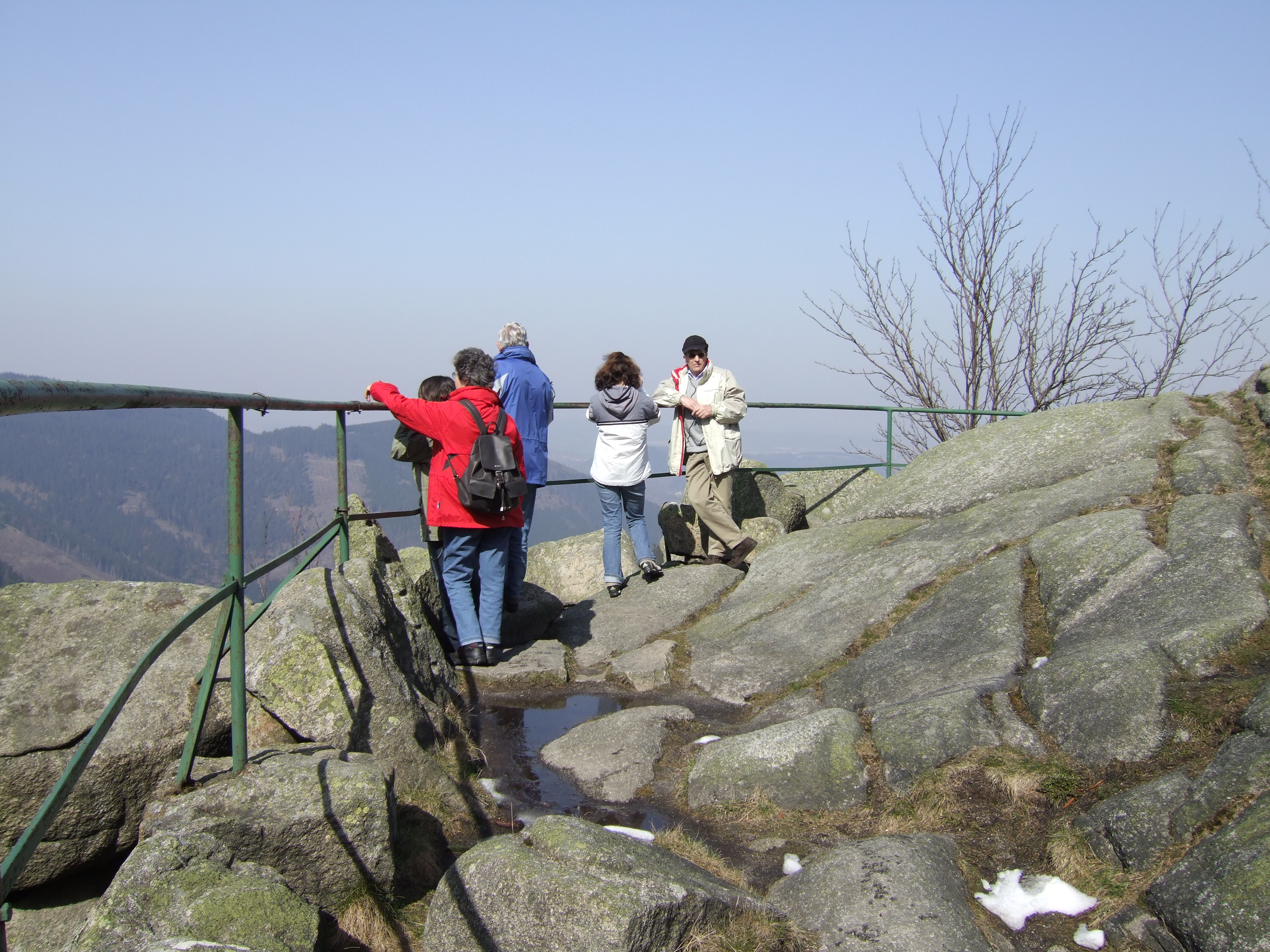
Observation platform

The Kästeklippen, often shortened to Käste, is a rocky tor above the Oker valley in the Upper Harz mountains of central Germany. It lies at a height of 602 m above NN.

Near the Käste are other similar granite rock formations such as the Hexenküche ("Witch's Kitchen"), Mausefalle ("Mousetrap"), Feigenbaumklippe and the Treppenstein. Next to the observation platform is a protruding rock which resembles the face of an old man and is called Der Alte vom Berge ("Old Man of the Mountain"). The rocks consist of granite "wool sacks", typical of the Harz region.

The Kästeklippen (Klippen = crags) are a popular destination in the Harz. From here, there are views to the Sudmerberg hill in the borough of Goslar. Numerous paths lead from the Oker Reservoir, Romkerhall, Oker, Göttingerode and Bad Harzburg up to the Käste. The most important access route is the Kästestraße. It runs from Bad Harzburg up to the Schlackenplatz on the Morlberg and then continues at a height of just under 600 m over the Alte Schlewecke and the crags of the Stiefmutterklippen to the Käste. From there it goes downhill again, past the Hinterer Ziegenrücken and Vorderen Ziegenrücken to Oker. The Kästestraße was once tarmacked all the way from Bad Harzburg to the Käste. Remnants of the asphalt surface can still be seen today. From the beginning of April to the end of October a bus service runs from Bad Harzburg to the Käste. The Kästehaus restaurant was demolished in 2019.

The Kästehaus is checkpoint no. 118 in the Harzer Wandernadel hiking trail network.

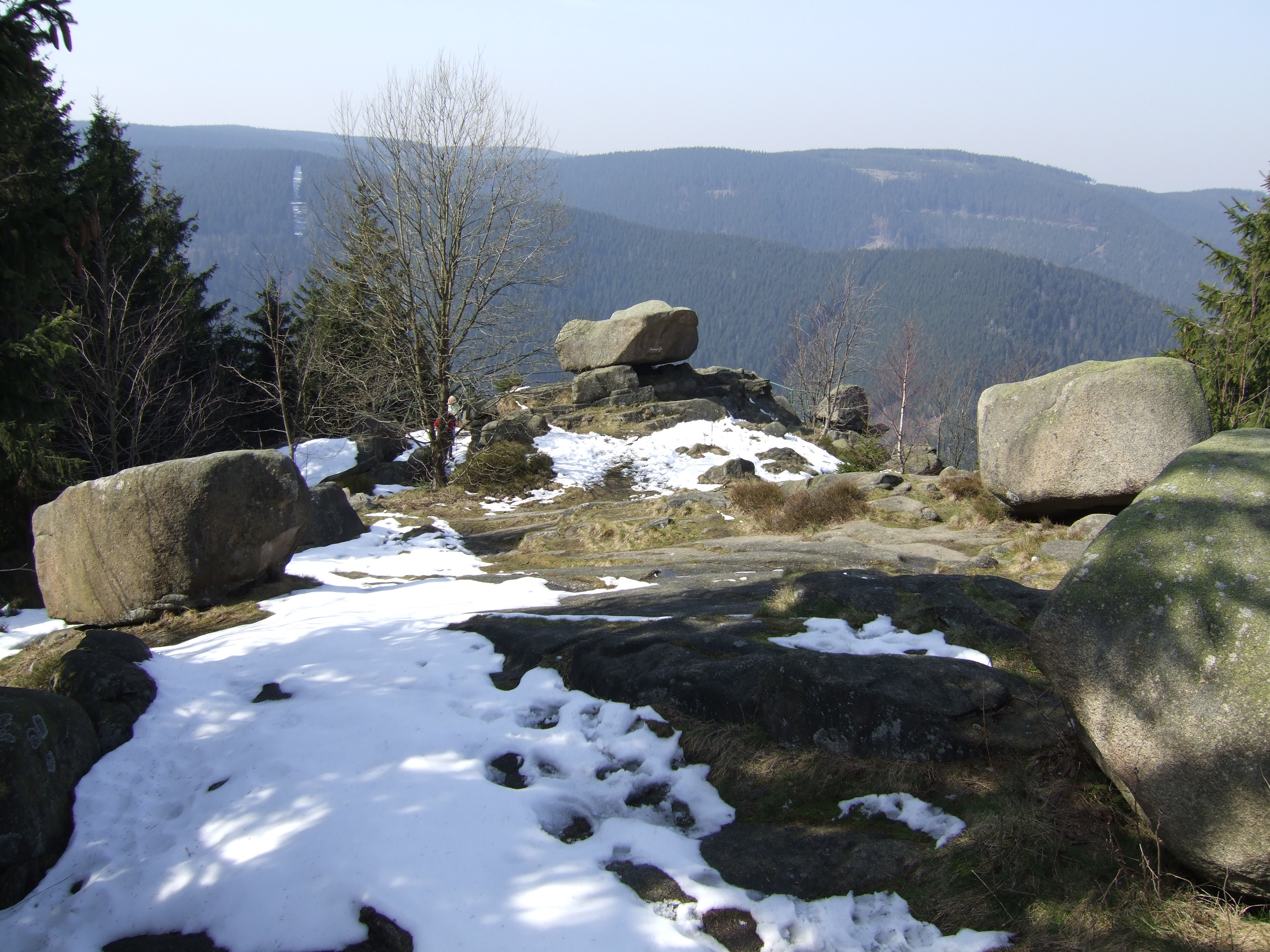
On the crags

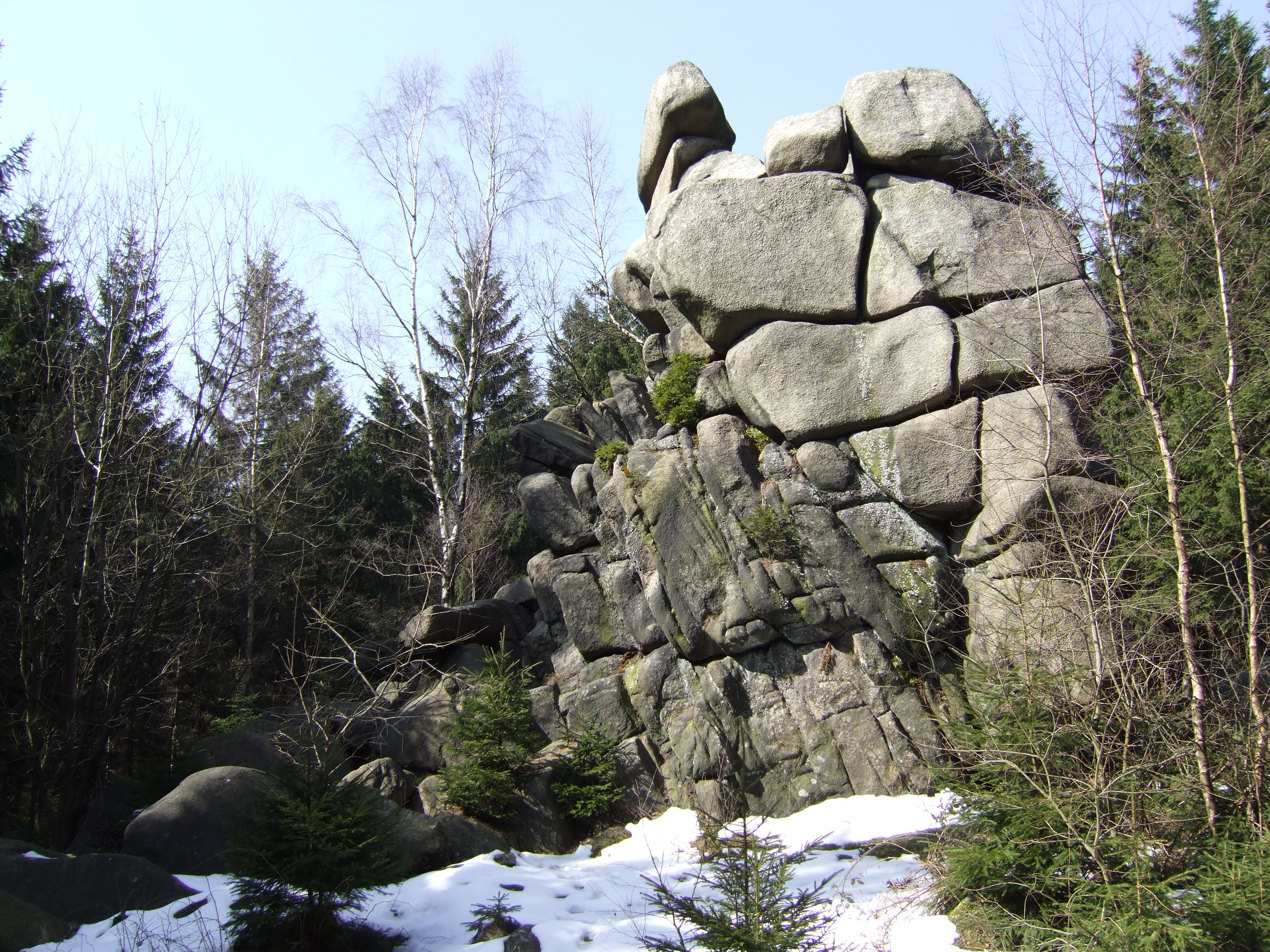
The Hexenküche

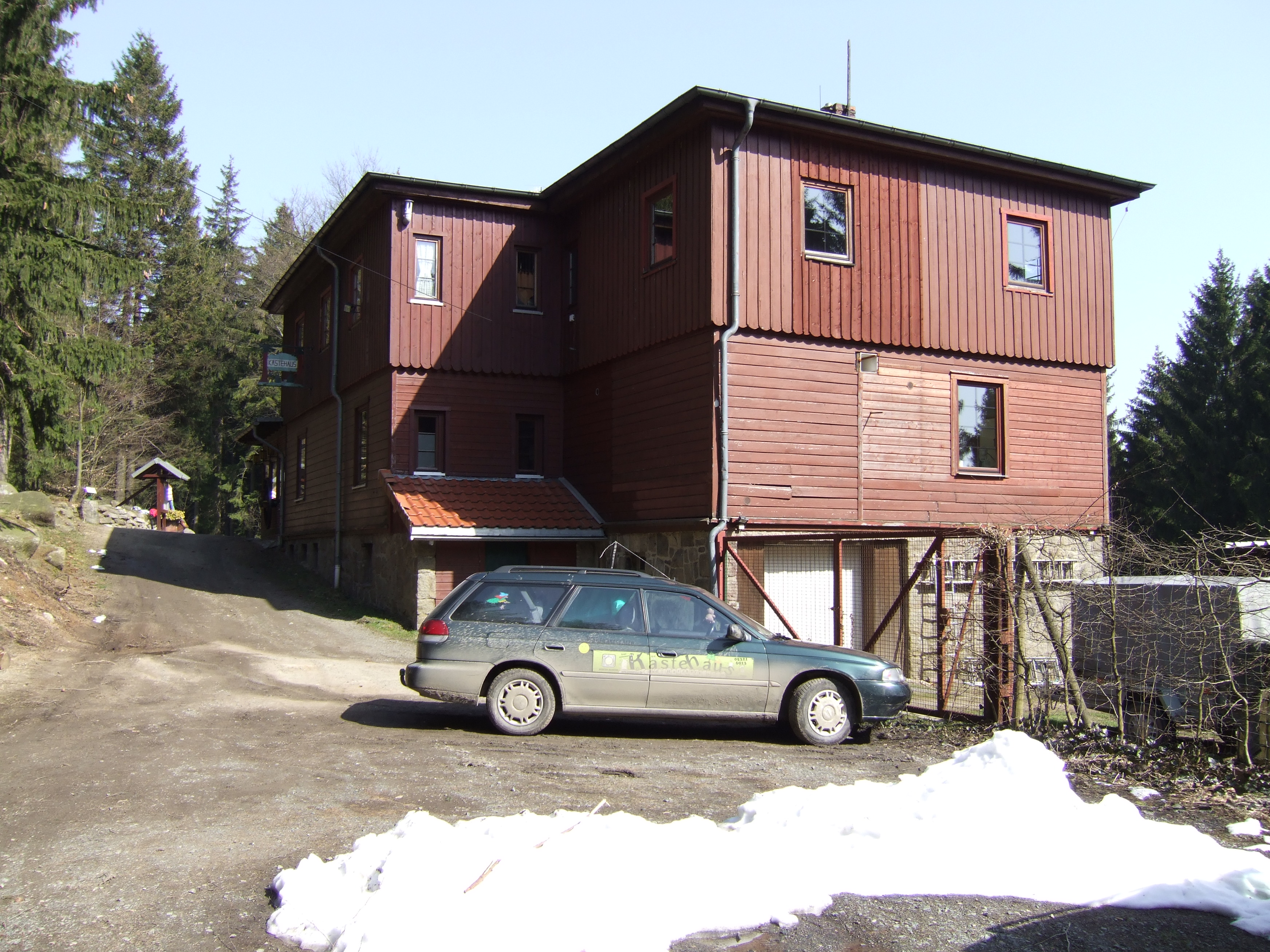
The former Kästehaus restaurant

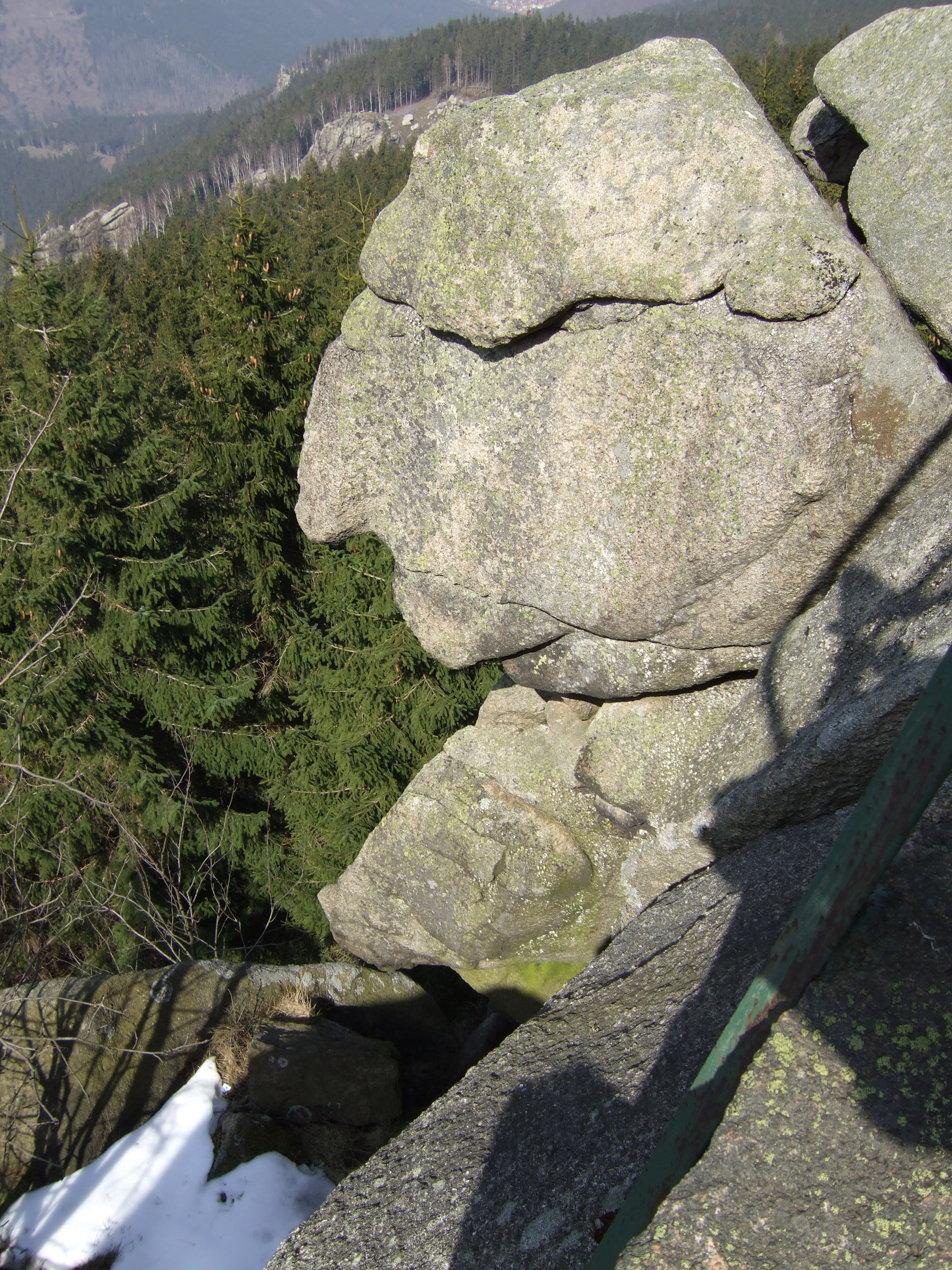
Der Alte vom Berge ("Old Man of the Mountain")

== See also ==
- Harzklippen
