= Treppenstein =

Coordinates: 51°52′20″N 10°28′50″E

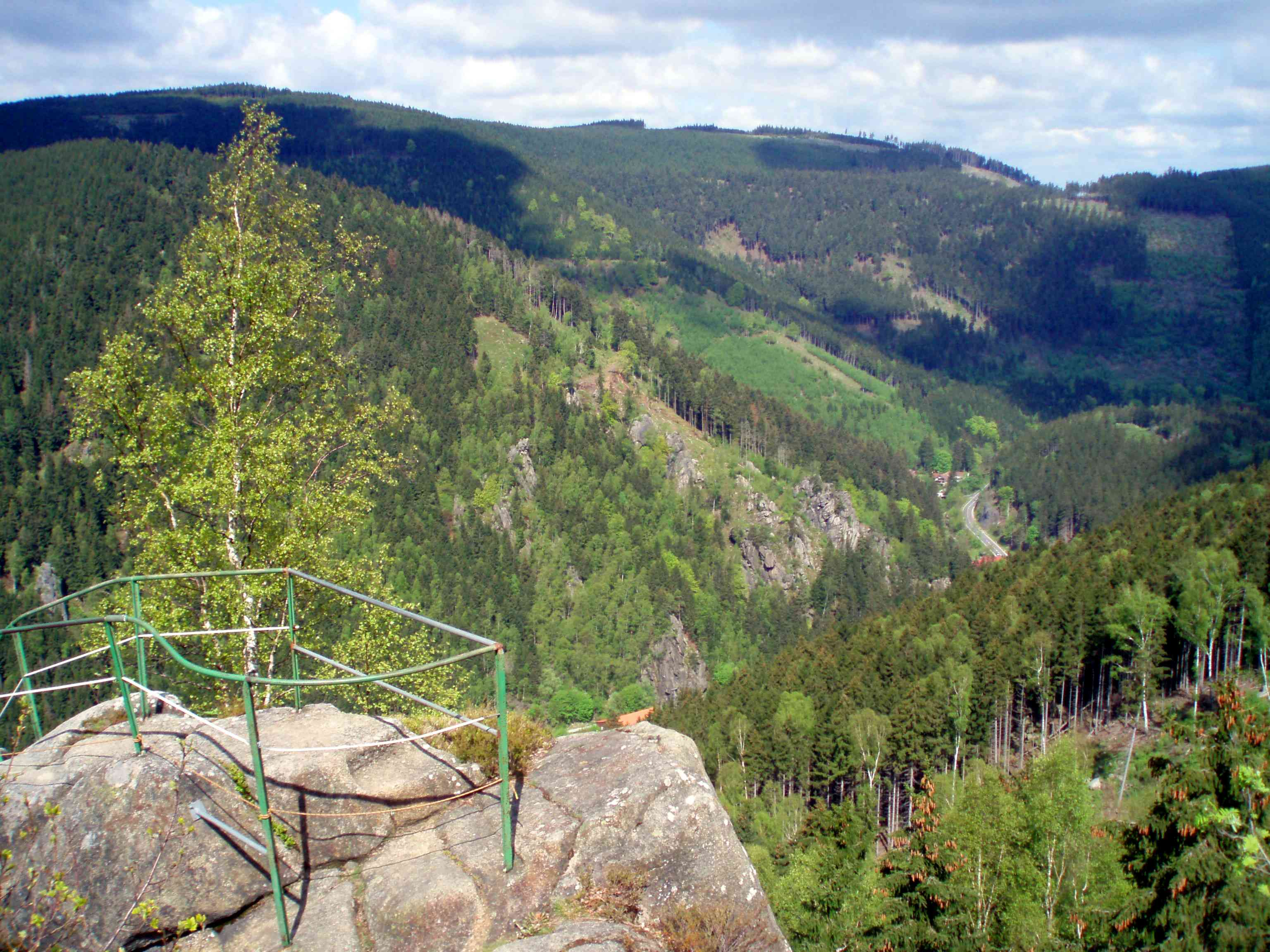
View of the Oker valley from the Treppenstein

The Treppenstein is a rock formation in the Oker valley in the Harz mountains of central Germany. It lies on the trail from the Romkerhall Waterfall to the Kästeklippen. The rocks consist of granite and have clearly undergone so-called "wool sack weathering" (Wollsackverwitterung).

The Treppenstein is a popular destination and part of the system of checkpoints (no. 117) in the Harzer Wandernadel hiking trail network. The summit has safety railings and may be climbed using steps hacked out of the rock and flights of stairs attached to the rocks. From the summit there is a view towards the west. In addition, part of the rock formation, the Kleine Treppenstein is used for rock climbing. The routes here are rated as Grade VI (UIAA).
