= Romkerhall =

Coordinates: 51°51′34″N 10°28′17″E

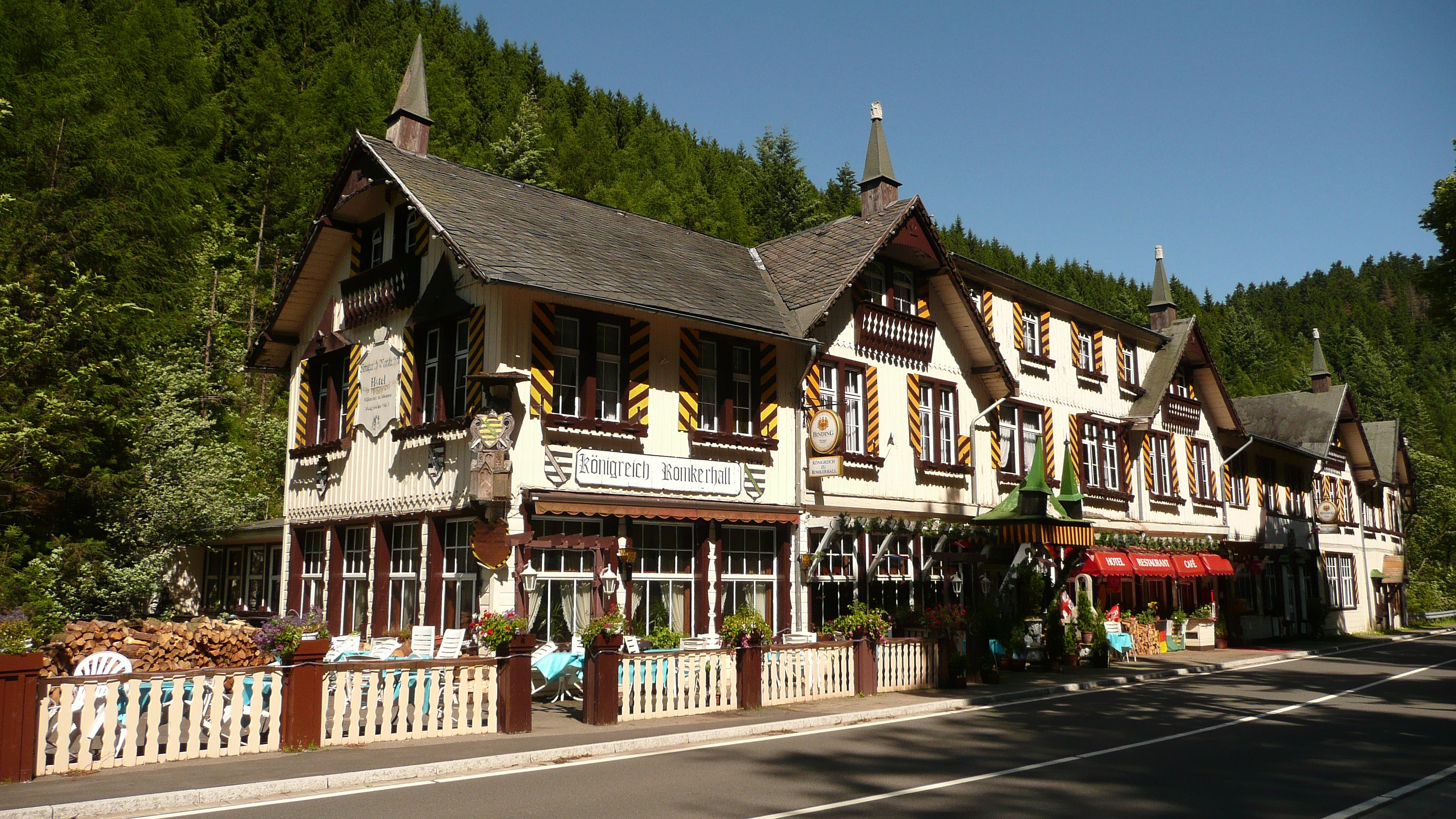
Romkerhall

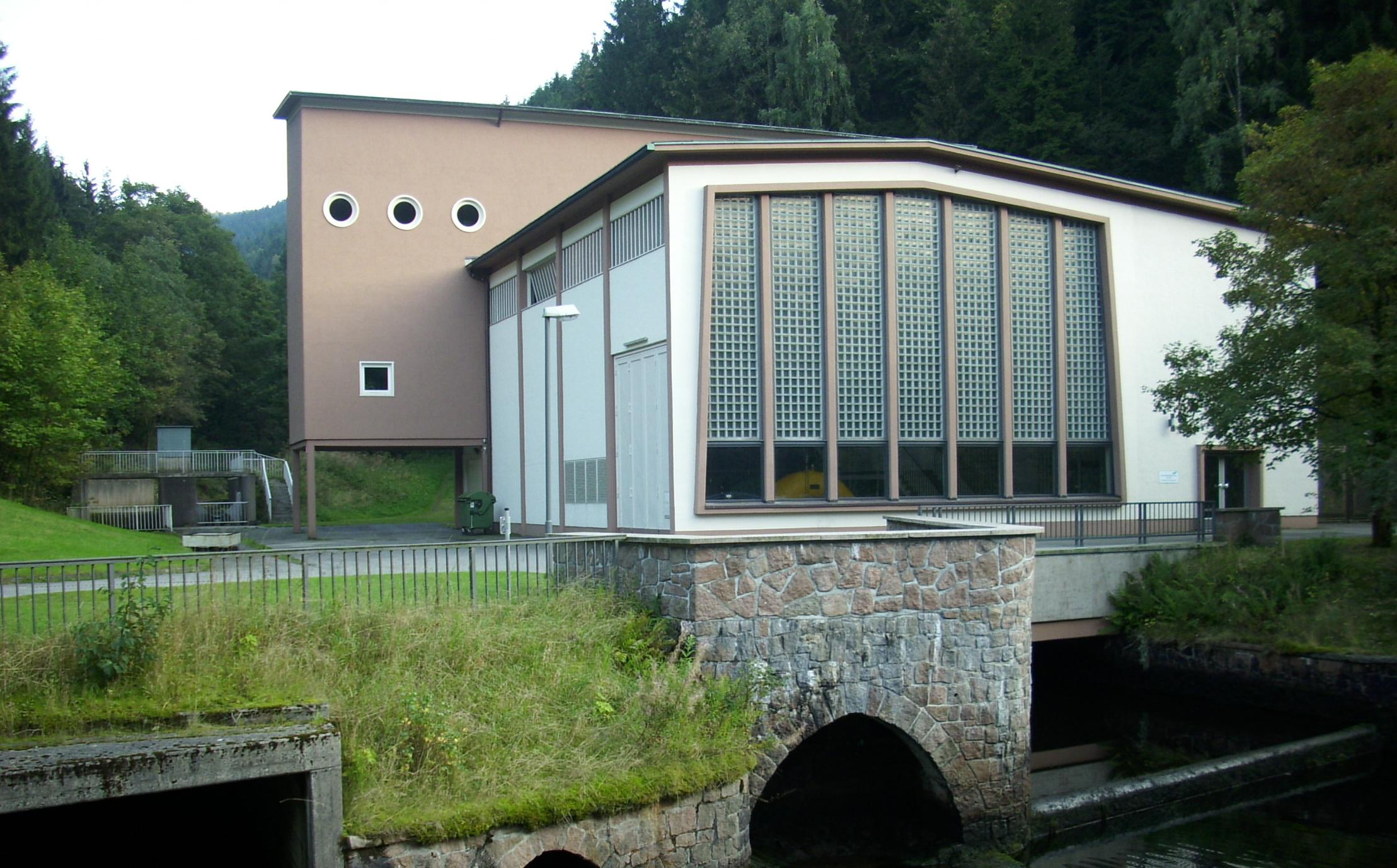
Romkerhall hydropower works

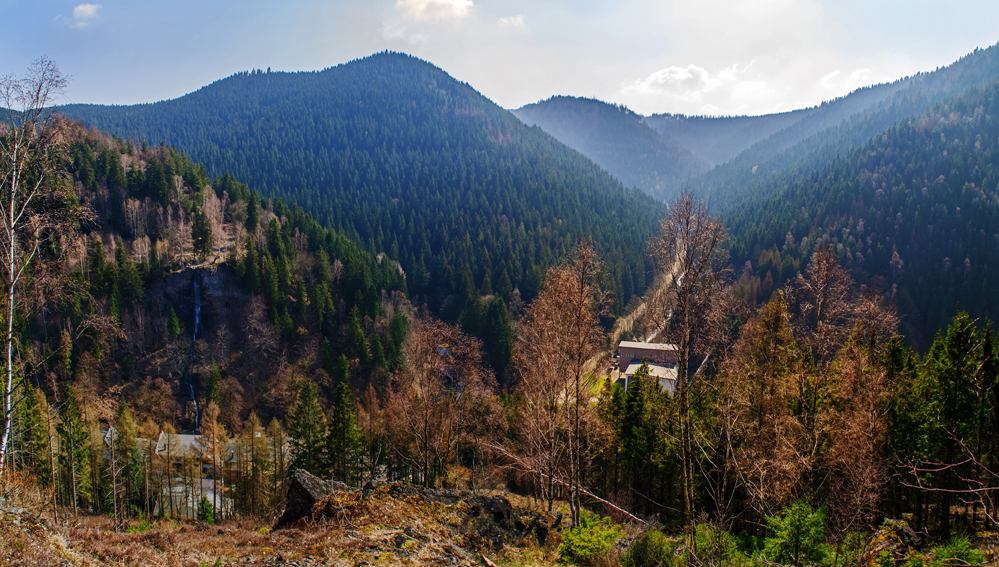
Romkerhall mit Kraftwerk und Wasserfall

Romkerhall (also frequently called Romkerhalle) is a popular tourist destination on the River Oker in the Harz Mountains of Germany. There is a public car park here as well as a hotel and restaurant opposite the Romkerhall Waterfall. Romkerhall lies within the unincorporated area of Harz in the Lower Saxon county of Goslar in the Harz Mountains. The hotel and waterfall form a small tourist attraction which is marketed as the "Kingdom of Romkerhall - the smallest kingdom in the world!" (German: "Königreich Romkerhall − das kleinste Königreich der Welt!")

== Location ==
Romkerhalle lies in the Upper Harz within the Harz Nature Park, around 5 kilometres south of the village of Oker in the borough of Goslar and about 1.5 kilometres (both distances as the crow flies) northeast of the Oker Reservoir on the B 498 federal road which runs parallel to the River Oker, here at a height of 335 m above sea level (NHN). About 200 metres to the south is the Romkerhalle Hydropower Station, in which electricity is generated from the waters of the reservoir. The inn belongs to the town of Goslar and the electricity station to the municipality of Schulenberg im Oberharz to the south of Goslar in the collective municipality of Oberharz. Between the power station and Romkerhalle the Große Romke and Kleine Romke streams approach from the east and discharge into the Oker.

== History ==
In order to promote and facilitate traffic, the expansion of the road network in the area began in the early 19th century. In 1817, according to a plan by treasury secretary (Kammersekretär) von Eschwege, the first road was built in the Oker valley, running along the Ziegenrücken ridge past the Studentenklippe crags and Kästenecke. The extraction of timber was now made easier and timber hauliers could easily reach the Upper Harz. This narrow and romantic road still exists on the eastern side of the valley on its lower slopes and is walkable. It descends to Romkerhalle, where once a large, arched stone bridge crossed the Oker.

Under the direction of the chief mining engineer (Oberbergmeister), Ahrend, a new, "comfortable road" was driven through the Oker valley to the "birch valleys" (Birkentäler). This was built from 1856 to 1861 with great difficulty, requiring the blasting of large quantities of rock down to the river banks and costing a total of 28,945 thalers. In 1865, under the direction of the chief smelting engineer, timber was rafted for the last time on the river and the weir on the Oker below the church, built in 1542, was removed. After that, several wood sanding works were set up in the lower Oker valley.

The rocks of the Romkerhall Waterfall had attracted attention even before the waterfall was created. From 1861, the Forestry and Hunting Division in Brunswick leased an area of 40 square rods and two acres from the forest hamlet of Käste No. 3, Oker Mining District, to innkeeper Lüer from Oker for the purpose of establishing an inn. A ceremonial opening by its owner and operator, H. Lüer, took place on 1 May 1863.

In 1863, in order to improve the accessibility of the property, the Harzburg Spa Commissar, Hermann Dommes, had a promenade path built from Harzburg across the Kästeklippen (Käste) to Romkerhalle.

The first land registry records were only kept from when the Hulsch family took over the estate in 1890. In 1903, the "Villa Helene" was built as a guesthouse and, in 1928, a large hall was built over the Oker. In the last days of the Second World War the Oker bridge of what is now the B 498 was blown up near Waldhaus and immediately south of Romkerhalle. This did not prevent the advance of the US Army, however. In addition, the inn was badly damaged and its reconstruction lasted until 1948.

Since 1988, the various managers of the local restaurant have advertised the place as the "Kingdom of Romkerhall". They justify this on the basis that the properties here do not belong to any municipality, but are located within an unincorporated area.

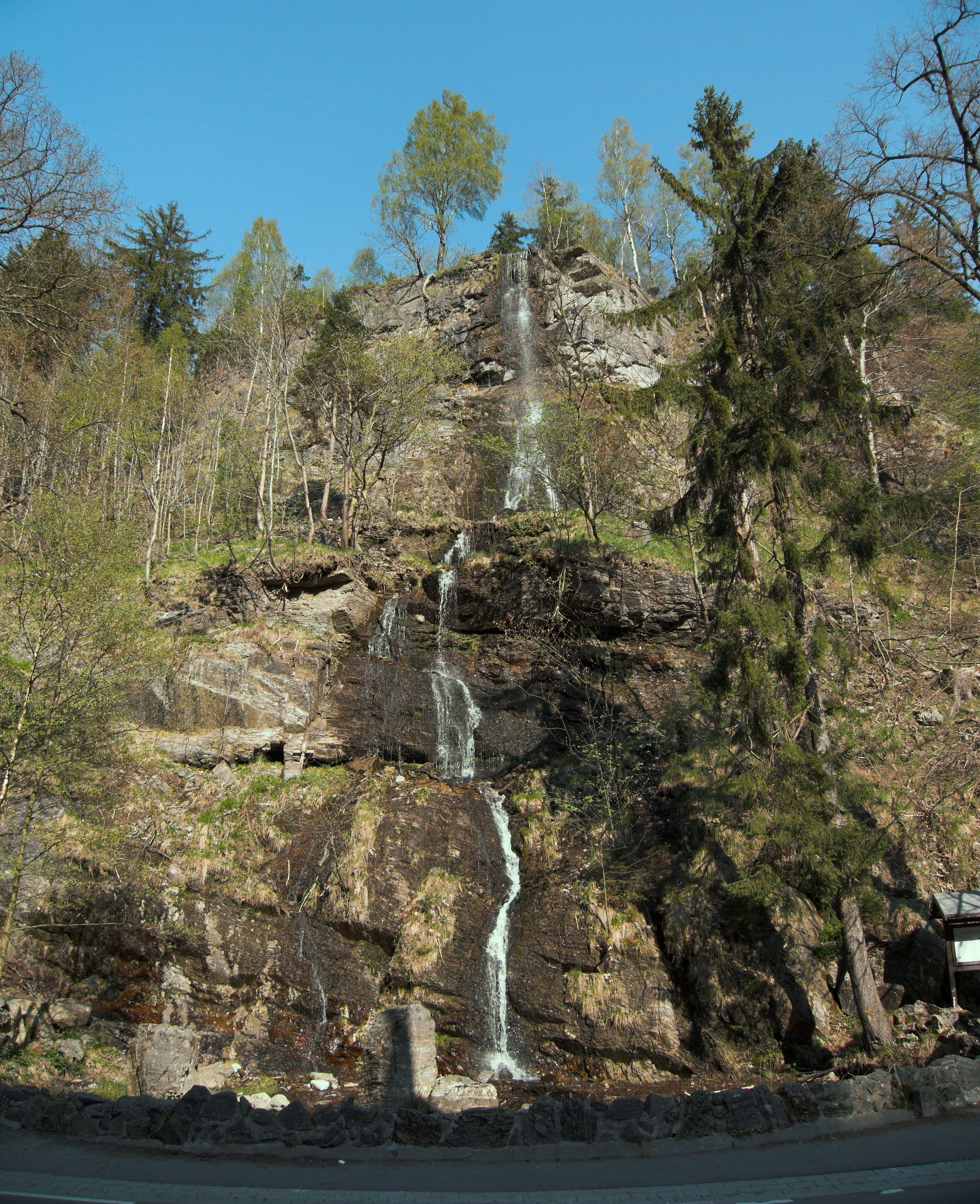
Romkerhall Waterfall

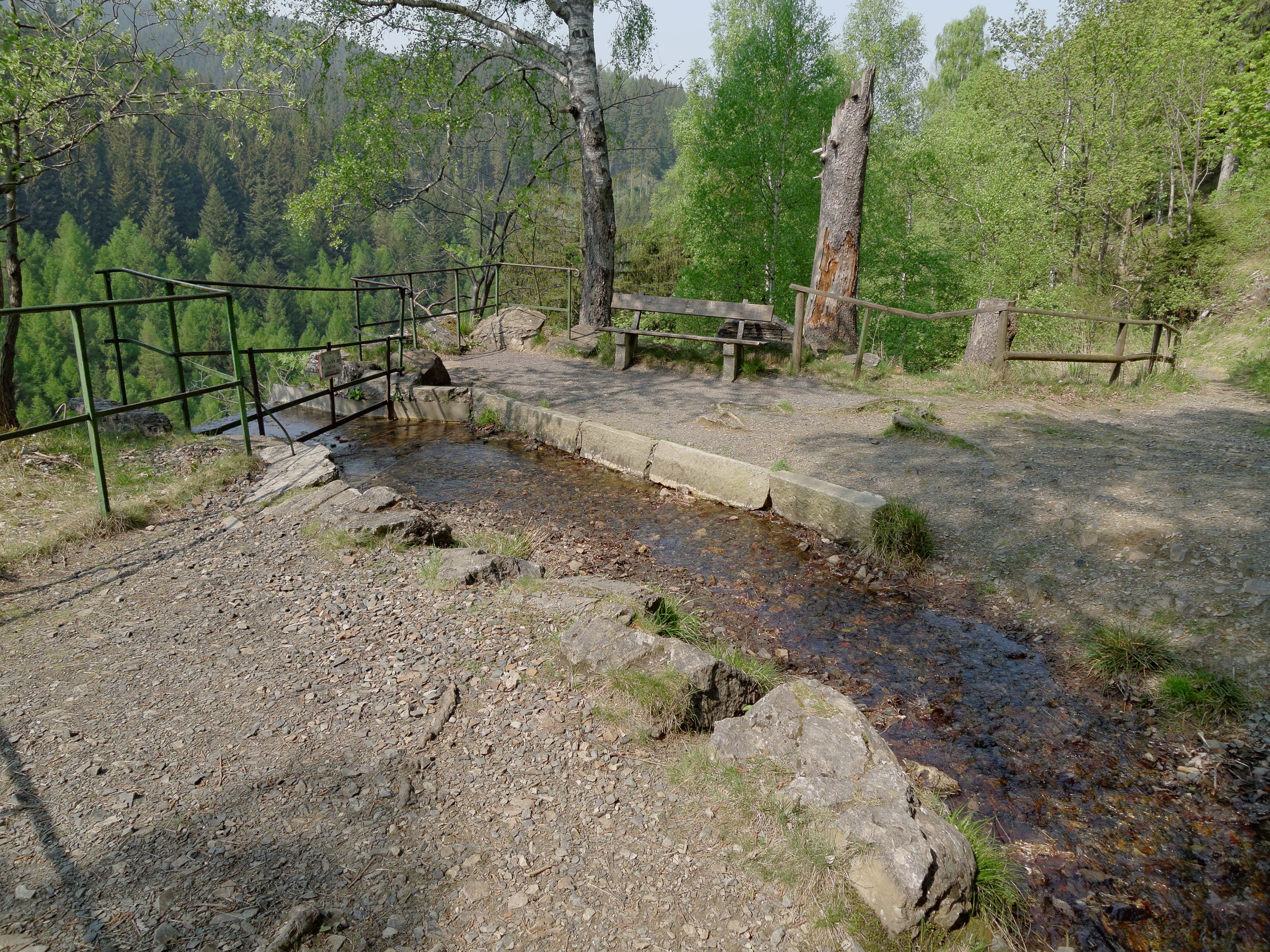
The stream leading to the waterfall

== Romkerhall Waterfall ==
=== Geography ===
Near Romkerhalle, on the rocky eastern flanks of the Oker valley below a spur of the Huthberg, the Kleiner Romke (441.7 m above NHN), the Romkerhall Waterfall (Romkerhaller Wasserfall) tumbles through a height of about 64 metres over the Romke Klippe crags (contemporaneously also known as the Rohmkerklippe or Marmorklippe). Its height makes it the highest artificial waterfall in the Harz Mountains. To create the waterfall, some of the waters of the Oker tributary, the Kleine Romke, are diverted along a roughly 350-metre-long ditch.

=== History ===
The present location name of Romkerhalle (initially Rohmker-Halle) was first used when Lüer's "board and lodging house" (Restauration und Logirhaus von H. Lüer was opened in 1863. In order to enhance the appeal of newly opened inn, in the same year the artificial waterfall was laid out. This was initially only operated in the afternoons and formed a cascade which resembled the Staubbach Fall in Switzerland's Lauterbrunnen valley in the Bernese Oberland, which attracted thousands of visitors.

=== Geology ===
The rocks of the Romerkhall Waterfall consist mainly of limestones. In the Upper Devonian, about 370 million years ago, the area was covered by a sea. It was divided into basins and ridges. Limes were deposited on the ridges, which were closer to the surface of the water (carbonatic threshold facies of the Upper Harz Upper Devonian). About 300 million years ago, the rocks were folded, sunk, metamorphosed by intruding granites, later uplifted again, and then exposed by erosion. That is how this old limestone comes to form the rocks over which the waterfall drops as well as the Rabenklippe crags to the west. In the intervening Oker valley is argillaceous Kulm slate. There is a path up to the top of the waterfall on the hillside north of the rocks. At its foot, a few metres of dark slate-hornfels rocks of the Lower Carboniferous have been exposed. The waterfall rocks at the lookout platform consists of upper Devonian limestones, which are tectonically heavily deformed. About 290 million years ago, the molten Oker granite nearby hardened and overprinted all the nearby rocks in a process known as contact metamorphism.

== Tourism ==
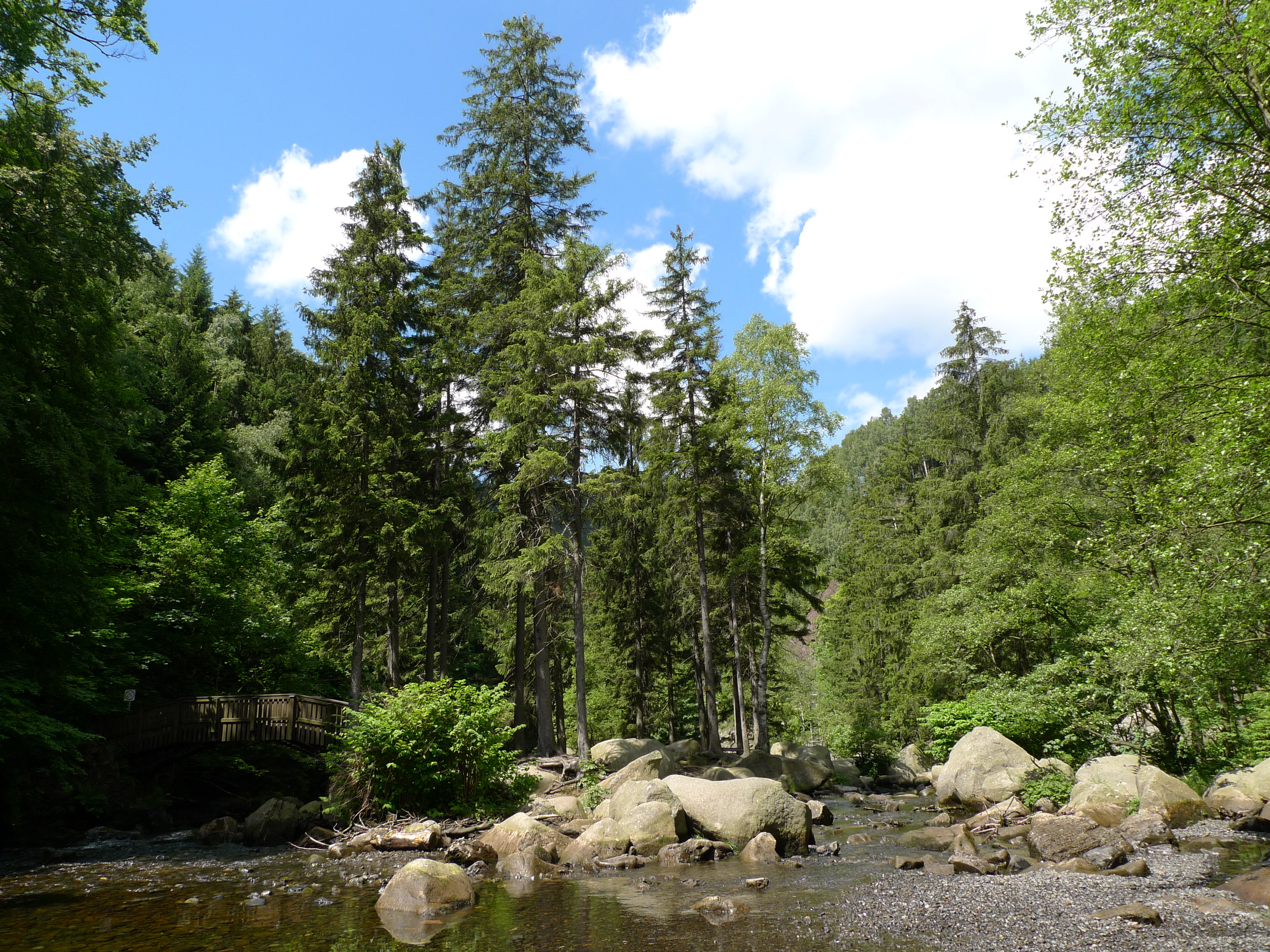
Verlobungsinsel and Verlobungsbrücke in the Oker Valley near Romkerhall

Romkerhall is both a departure point for several hiking trails as well as a waypoint on others. Downstream a path runs along the Oker, which is surrounded by high rocks that are used, mainly at weekends, by rock climbers. There are also many large boulders in the river which, in places, have formed small islands, including Betrothal Island (Verlobungsinsel), which is checkpoint no. 116 in the Harzer Wandernadel hiking system. From Romkerhall several steep paths lead up to the crags of the Treppenstein, the Ahrendsberger Klippen to the south, the Mausefalle on the Huthberg hill to the north and from there to the Kästeklippen. From the Ahrendsberger Klippen there is a clear view of Romkerhall and the waterfall. The Hallesche Hütte hut near the crags is the location of checkpoint no. 119 in the Harzer Wandernadel.

== Literature ==
- Hans Joachim Franzke & Irene Joss: Granitfelsen und Romkerhaller Wasserfall im Okertal, Clausthal University of Technology, at dgg.de (pdf; 362.4 KB)
- Hans-Joachim Franzke & Rainer Müller: Exkursion in einem geologischen Profil durch den West- und Mittelharz. In: Heinz-Gerd Röhling, Publ.: GeoHannover 2012 – GeoRohstoffe für das 21. Jahrhundert. Exkursionsführer und Veröffentlichungen der Deutschen Gesellschaft für Geowissenschaften 248, Hanover, 2012
- Das Okertal im Harz mit Hotel Romkerhalle. Offizieller Führer des Vereins zur Hebung des Fremdenverkehrs im Okertal, Sitz Romkerhalle, Mitglied des Harzer Verkehrs-Verbandes, Verein zur Hebung des Fremdenverkehrs im Okertal, Romkerhalle bei Oker: Hulsch, [ca. 1932].
