= Oker Dam =

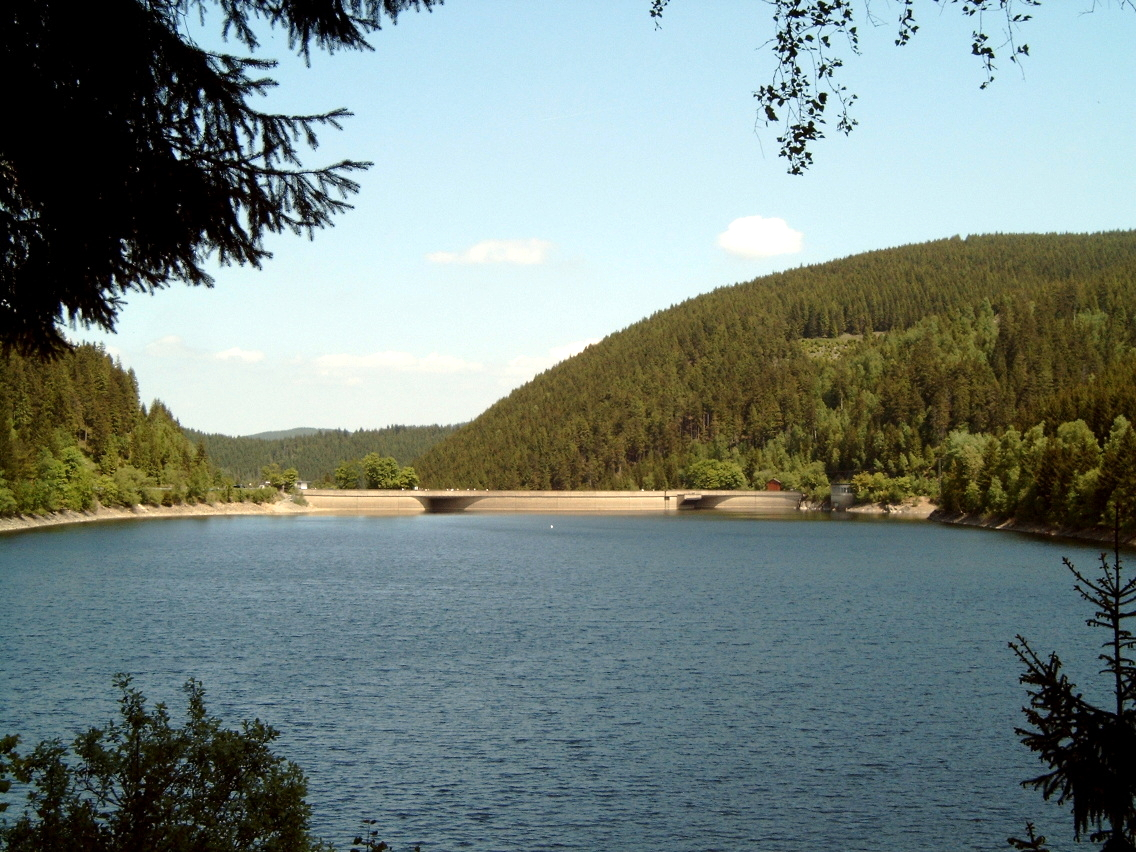

- Location within Germany
- Country: Germany
- Coordinates: 51°50′29″N 10°27′10″E
- Construction began: 1938
- Opening date: 1956

Dam and spillways
- Height: 75 m (246 ft)
- Length: 260 m (850 ft)
- Width (crest): 8 m
- Width (base): 19 m (62 ft)
- Dam volume: 140,000 m³

Reservoir
- Creates: Oker Reservoir
- Total capacity: 47,400,000 m³
- Catchment area: 85 km²
- Surface area: 225 ha

Power Station
- Installed capacity: 4.14 MW

The Oker Dam (German: Okertalsperre) is a dam in the Harz mountains in Lower Saxony, Germany. It is fed by the River Oker.

== Technology ==
The dam is in the shape of an arch (see arch-gravity dam). It is 75 m high, 260 m long, can impound up to 47 million m³ of water and provides hydropower, flood protection and water regulation at times of low water. It is also used indirectly for the production of drinking water. Its average annual discharge is 75 million m³. The hydro-electric power station at Romkerhalle is fed by the Oker Reservoir.

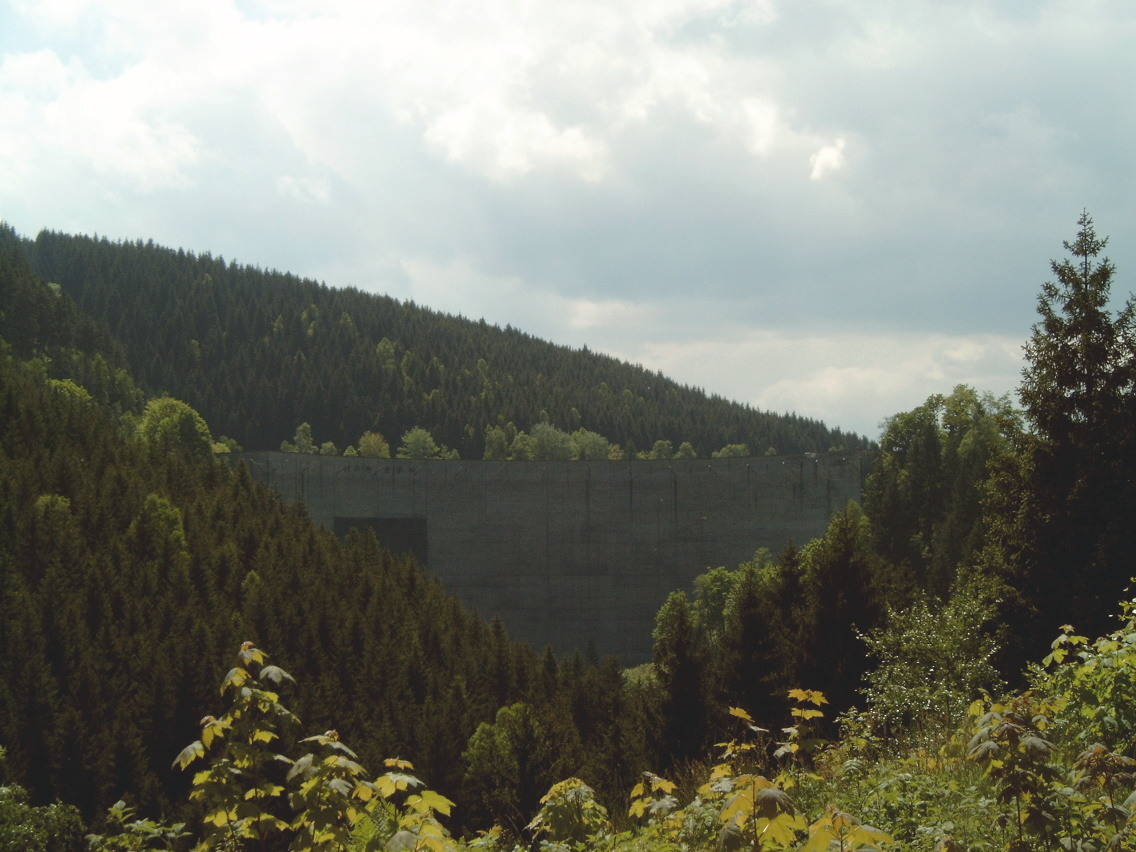
Dam, downstream side

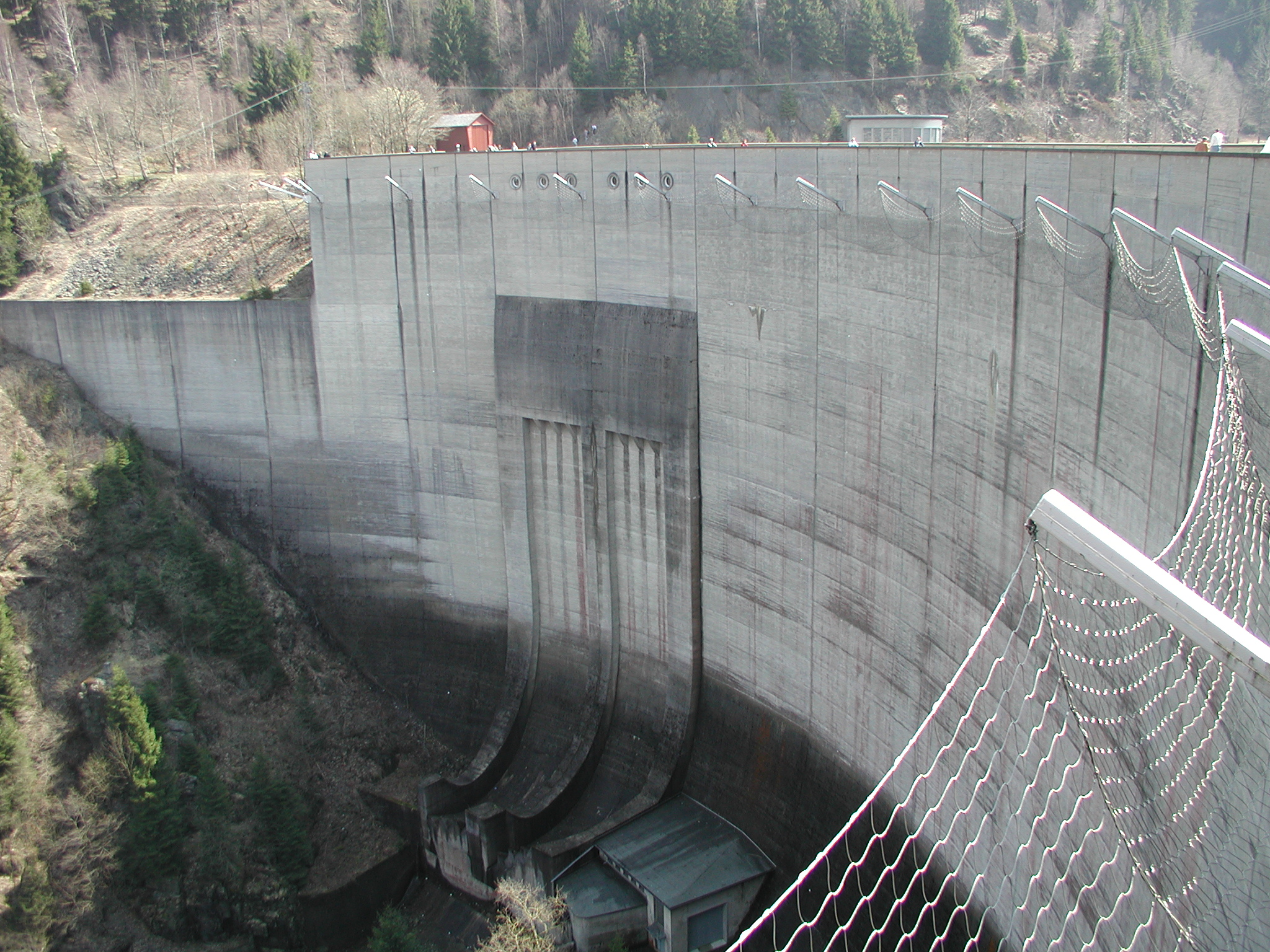
Downstream face of the dam

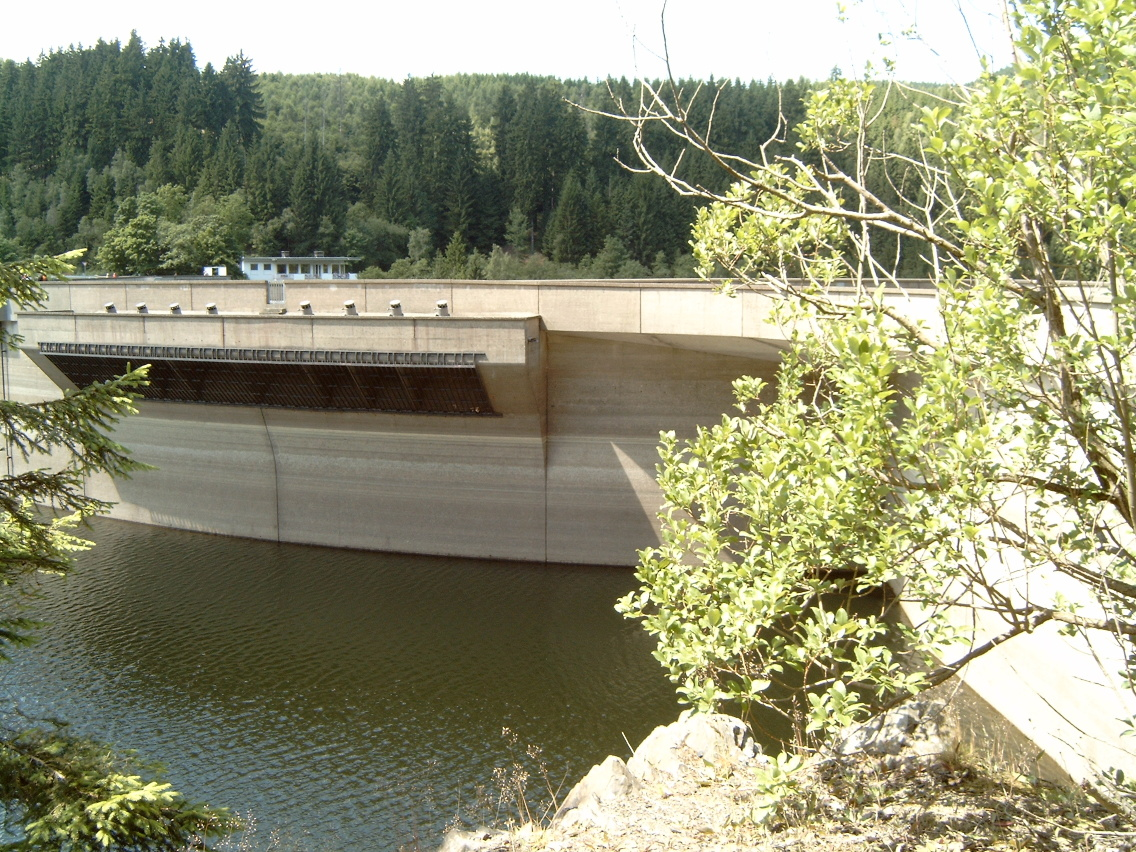
Spillways on the dam

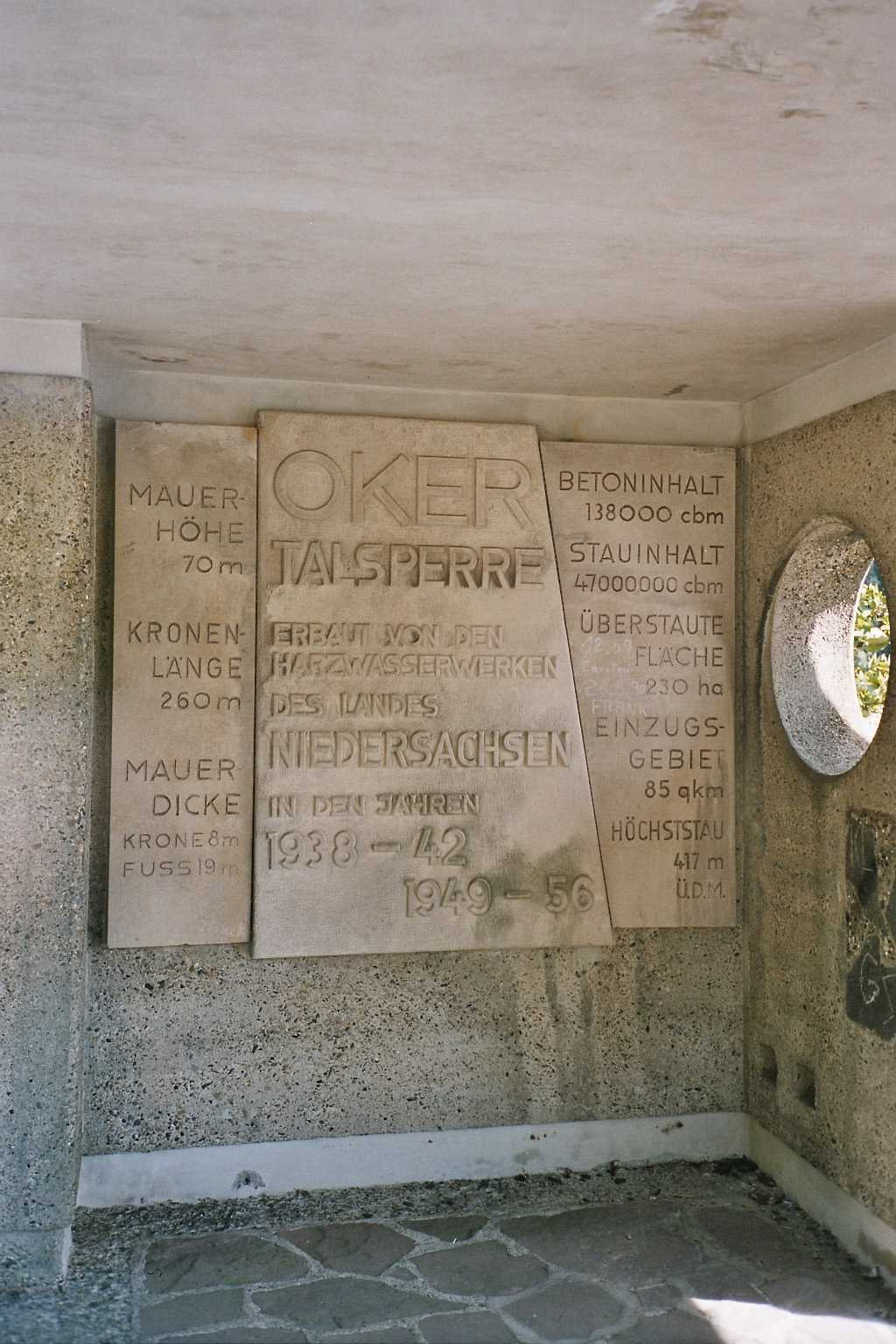
Table with technical data on the Oker Dam

== History and location ==
The construction of the Oker Dam was begun by Hr. Press in the years 1938 to 1942 and then completed between 1949 and 1956. Its completion became pressing following the devastating floods in Wolfenbüttel and Brunswick in the winter of 1946/47 when there were heavy falls of snow. Before work started the small hamlet of Schulenberg in the valley had to be abandoned; it was rebuilt above the reservoir.

The Oker Reservoir lies alongside the B 498 federal road, that follows the course of the River Oker between Goslar and Altenau. On the east bank is a forest road, that is out of bounds to private vehicles.

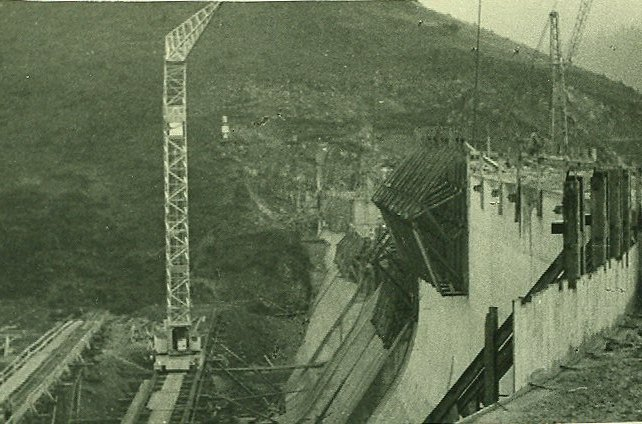
Main dam under construction

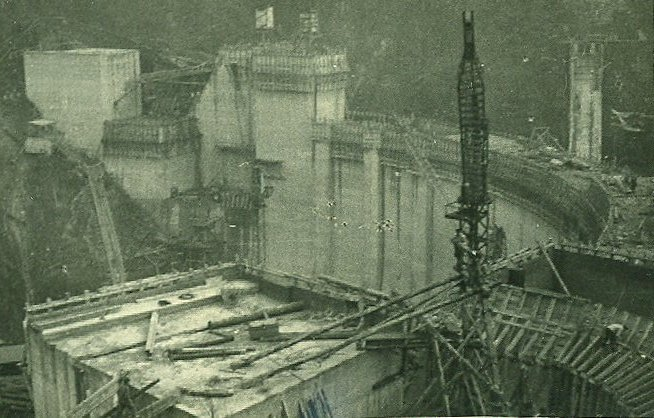
Main dam under construction

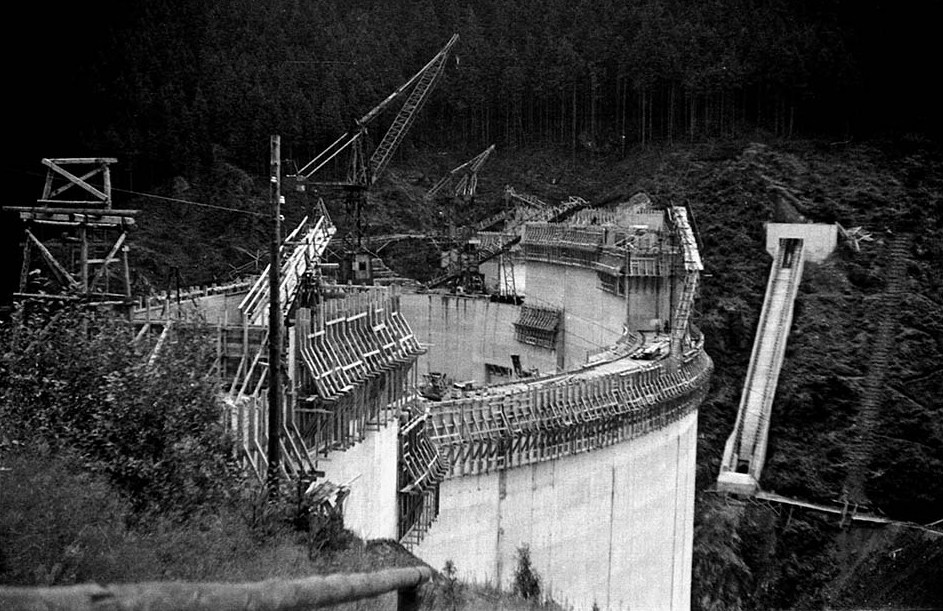
Main dam under construction

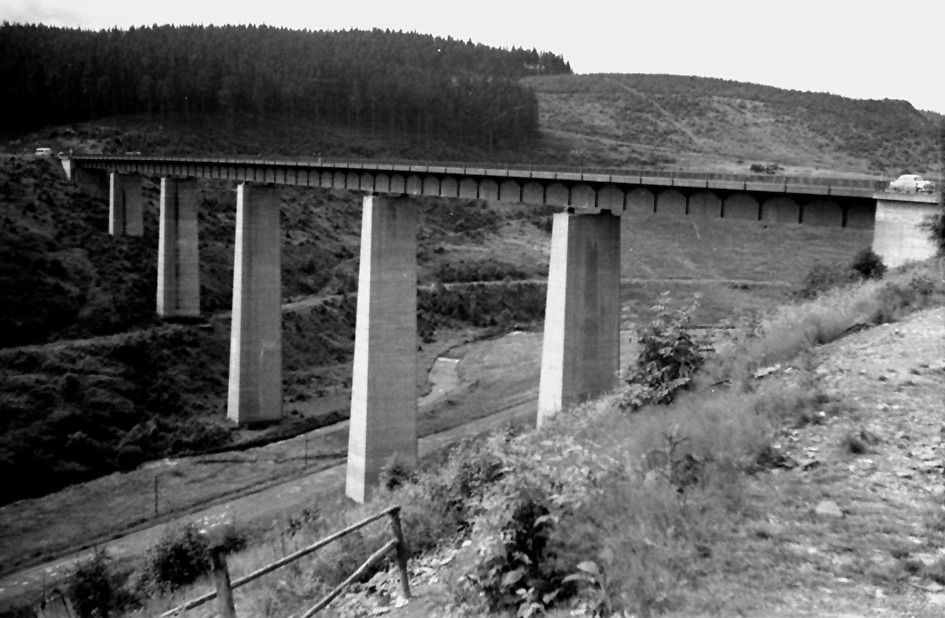

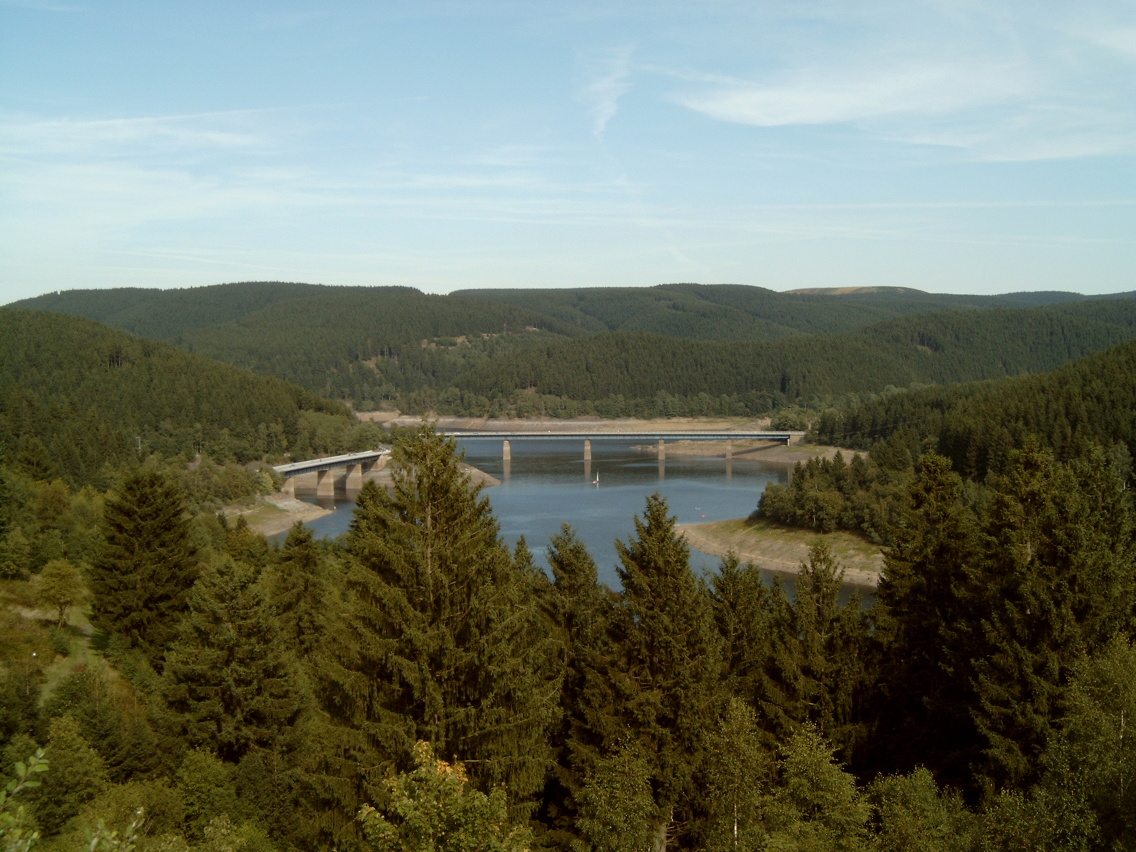
Oker Reservoir: view from Schulenberg to the Upper Harz

With its many side arms the Oker Reservoir resembles the much larger Bigge Reservoir in the Sauerland in west Germany. For the same reason it is also known as the "Vierwaldstättersee of the Harz".

== Tourism ==
From the beginning of March to the beginning of January a passenger boat plies the reservoir ferrying tourists (only at weekends during the off-peak seasons). The large tour on the MS Aquamarin takes approximately 1.5 hours and can be started from all landing stages around the reservoir. This boat service is the highest (above sea level in Lower Saxony. In addition, during the summer months, numerous, private, unmotorised water craft grace the waters of the reservoir. Swimming and diving are also permitted, apart from certain out-of-bounds areas such as the zone near the dam wall. In winter, when the ice is not thick enough to support weight, ice swimming takes place. There is a circular route, using roads and paths, around the Oker Reservoir which is accessible to unmotorised vehicles or walkers. Between the pre-dam and the primary dam there is a fully metalled circular path, which is used by cyclists, inline skaters and roller skiers. Only the path between the pre-dam and Altenau, which is barred to motor vehicles, is not metalled, but is surfaced with gravel and stone. On the B 498 in summer there is heavy motorcycle traffic (on the northern approach to Torfhaus). There are numerous restaurants and cafés along the road. In very calm conditions (no wind or precipitation and no man-made disturbances) a very flat surface forms on the reservoir which mirrors clearly the surrounding landscape.

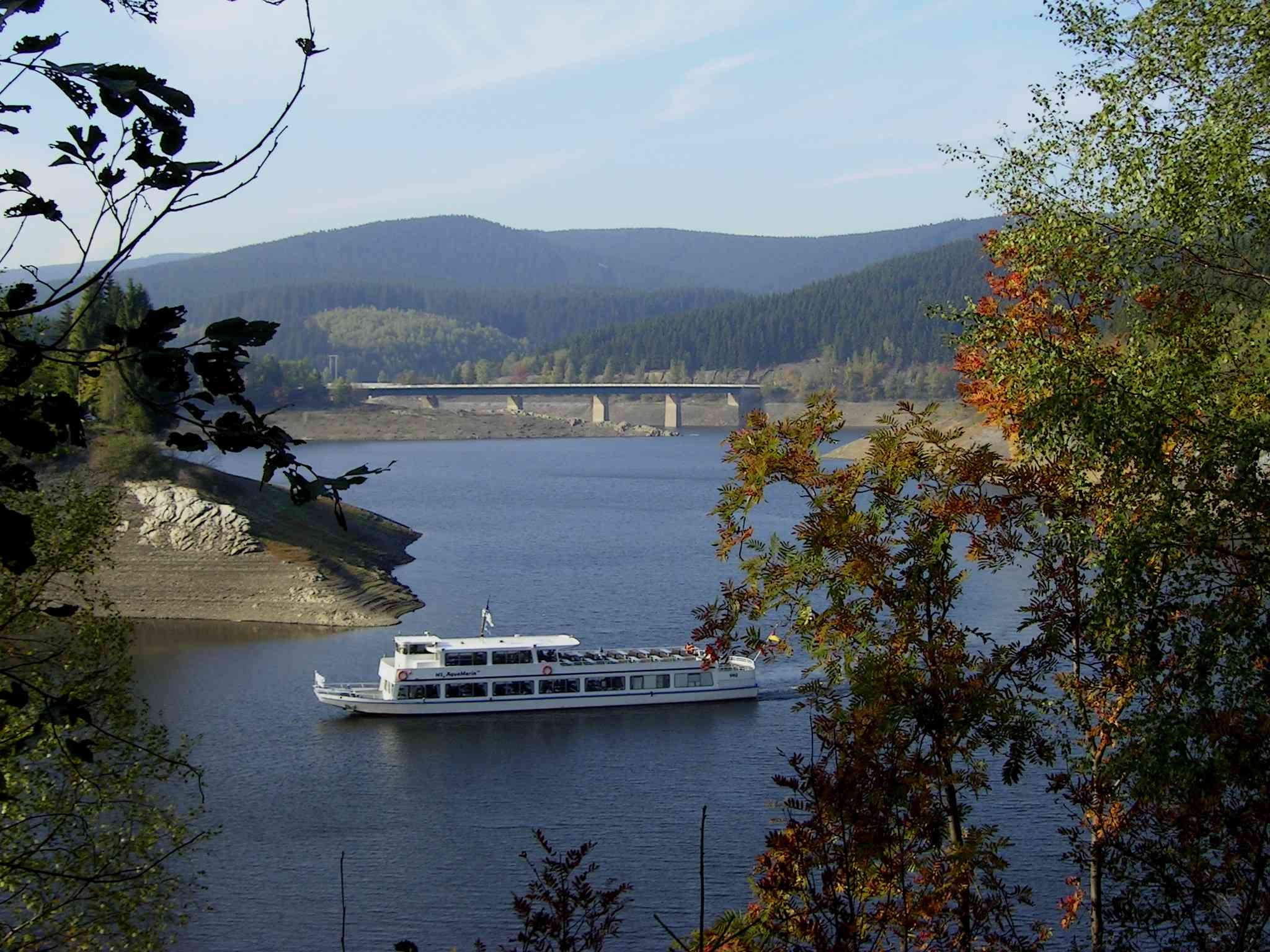
Passenger boat on the reservoir; Weißwasser Bridge in the background

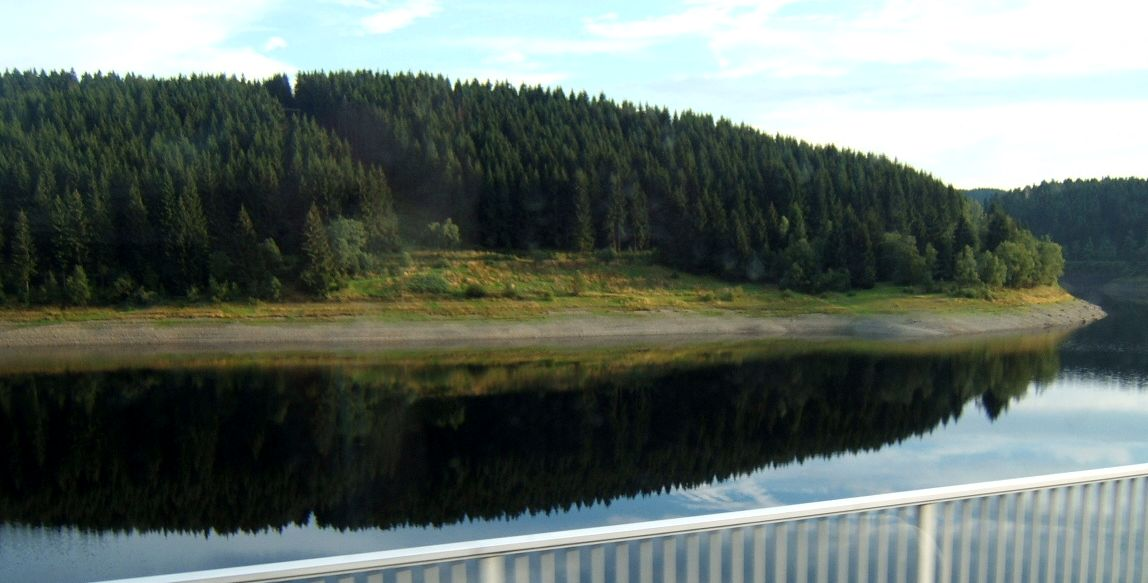
The Oker Reservoir in calm weather

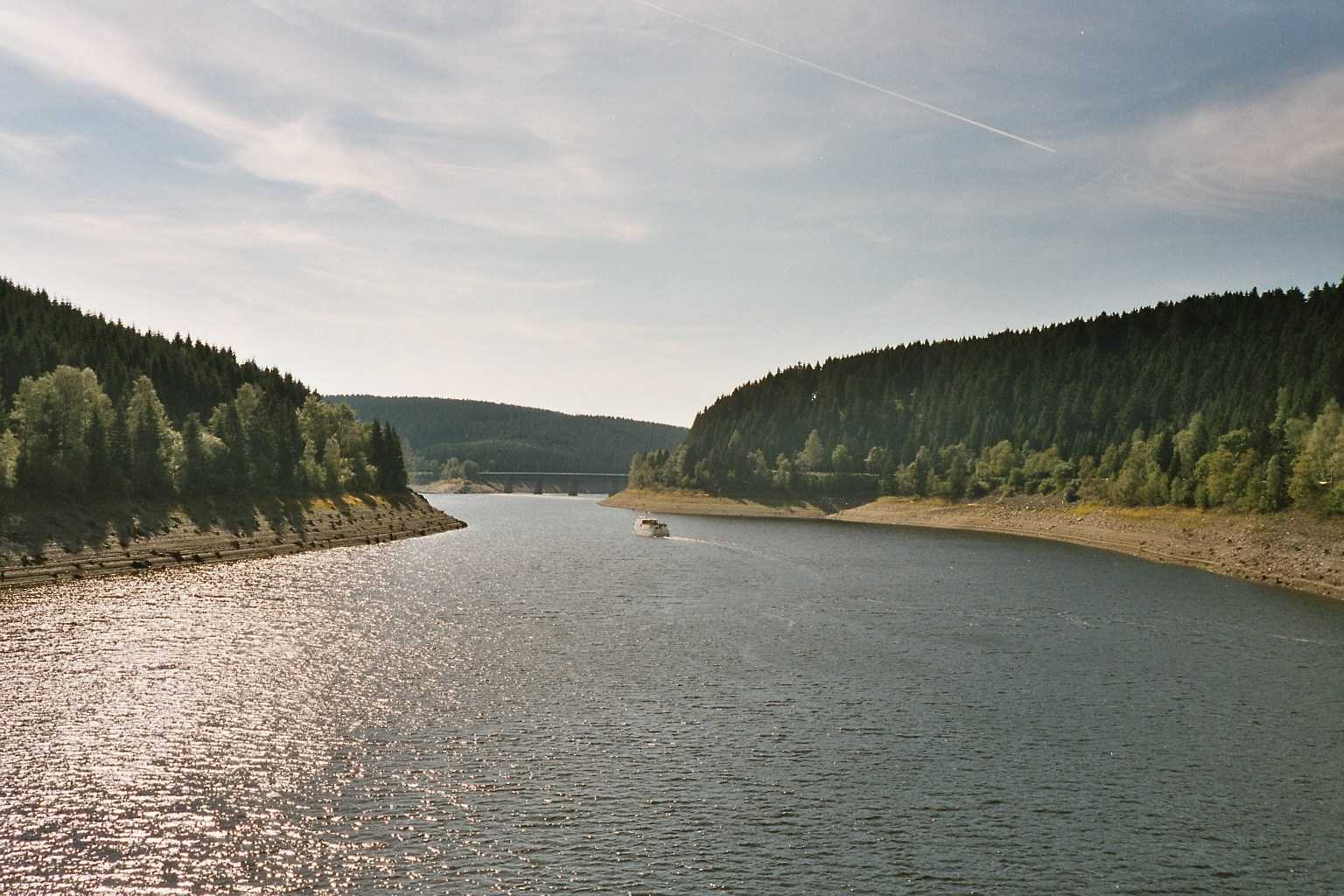
The reservoir at low water

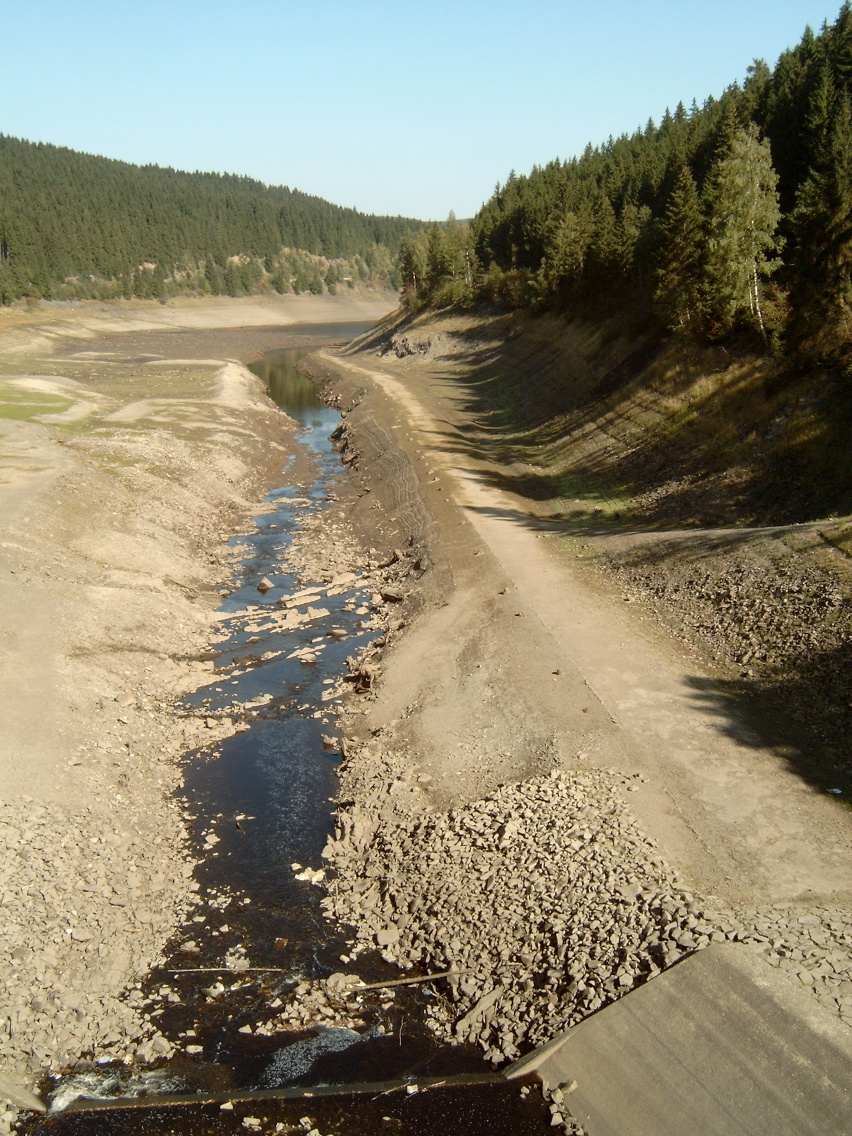
The Oker in the Oker Reservoir at low water

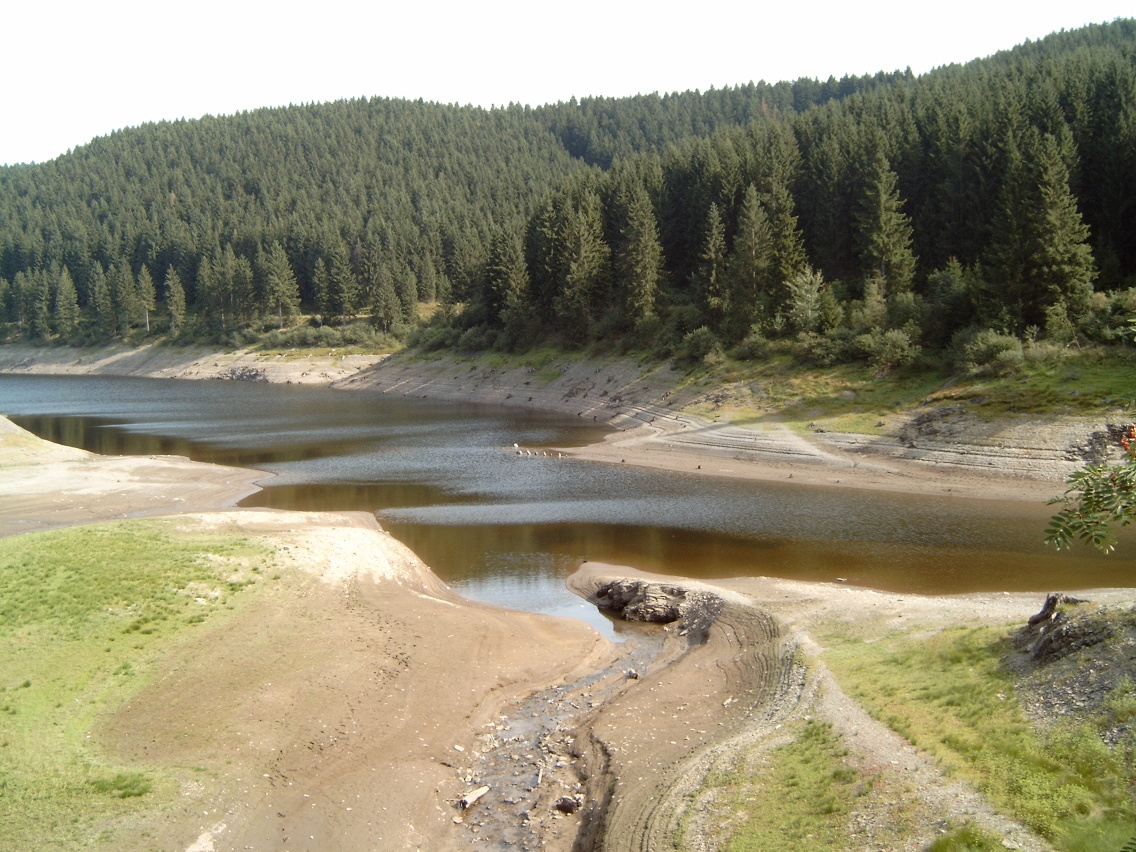
Side branch of the Oker Reservoir at low water

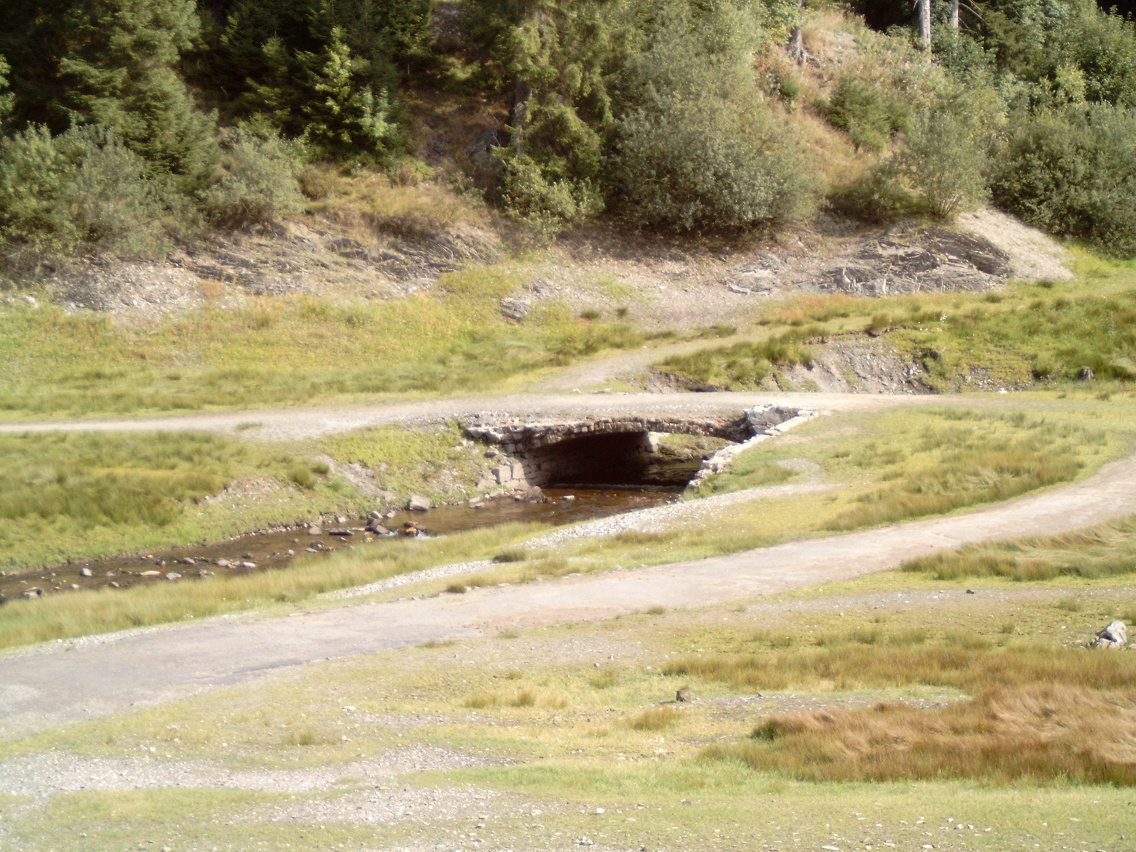
Occasionally flooded bridge on the Oker Reservoir at low water

== Facilities belonging to the Oker Dam ==
=== Pre-Dam ===
Oker Pre Dam
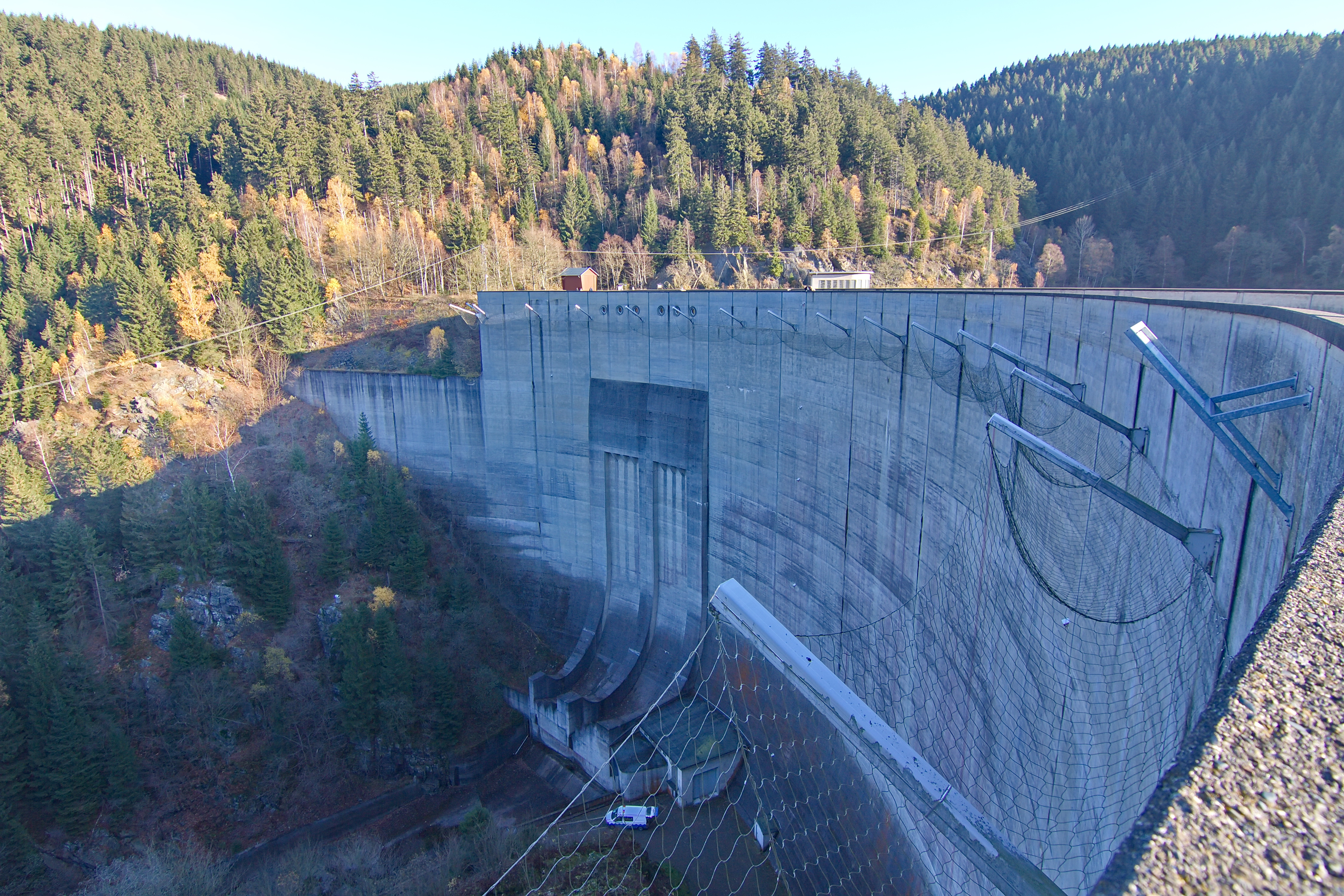
- Interactive map of Oker Pre Dam
- Country: Germany
- Coordinates: 51°49′19″N 10°26′42″E
- Construction began: 1953
- Opening date: 1954

Dam and spillways
- Height: 20 m (66 ft)
- Length: 100 m (330 ft)
- Width (base): 14.0 m (45.9 ft)
- Dam volume: 16,000 m³

Reservoir
- Total capacity: 520,000 m³
- Surface area: 12 ha

The pre-dam (Vorsperre) of the Oker Reservoir is of the gravity dam type, with a height of 20.0 metres. The pre-dam can impound up to 520,000 m³ of water and its primary purpose is to control the water level and cleanliness of the Oker Reservoir. The dam site was designed as a retention basin (max. 15 m of water at the pre-dam) in order to create a wetland in the Kellwasser valley. Only when there is a very high level of water in the Oker Reservoir are both reservoirs at the same height. The water level in the pre-dam lake can even rise a few decimetres higher.

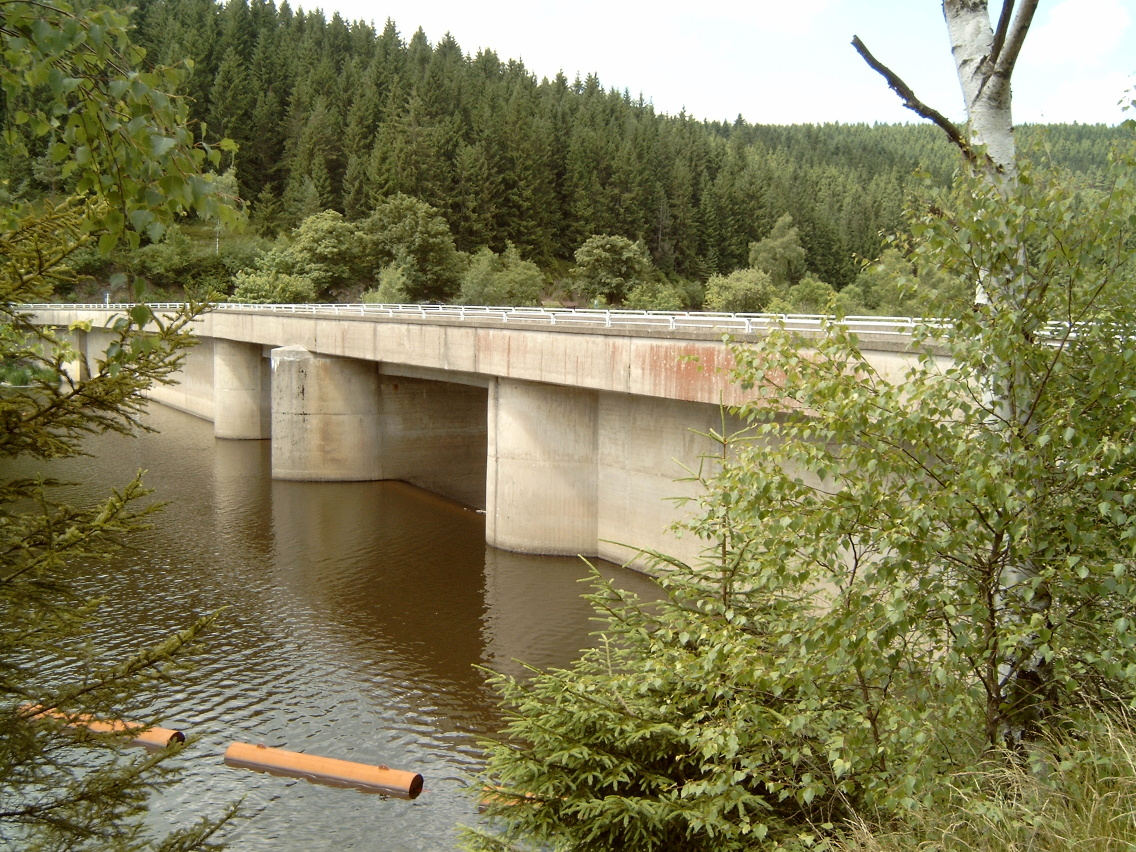
Pre-dam, retention basin side

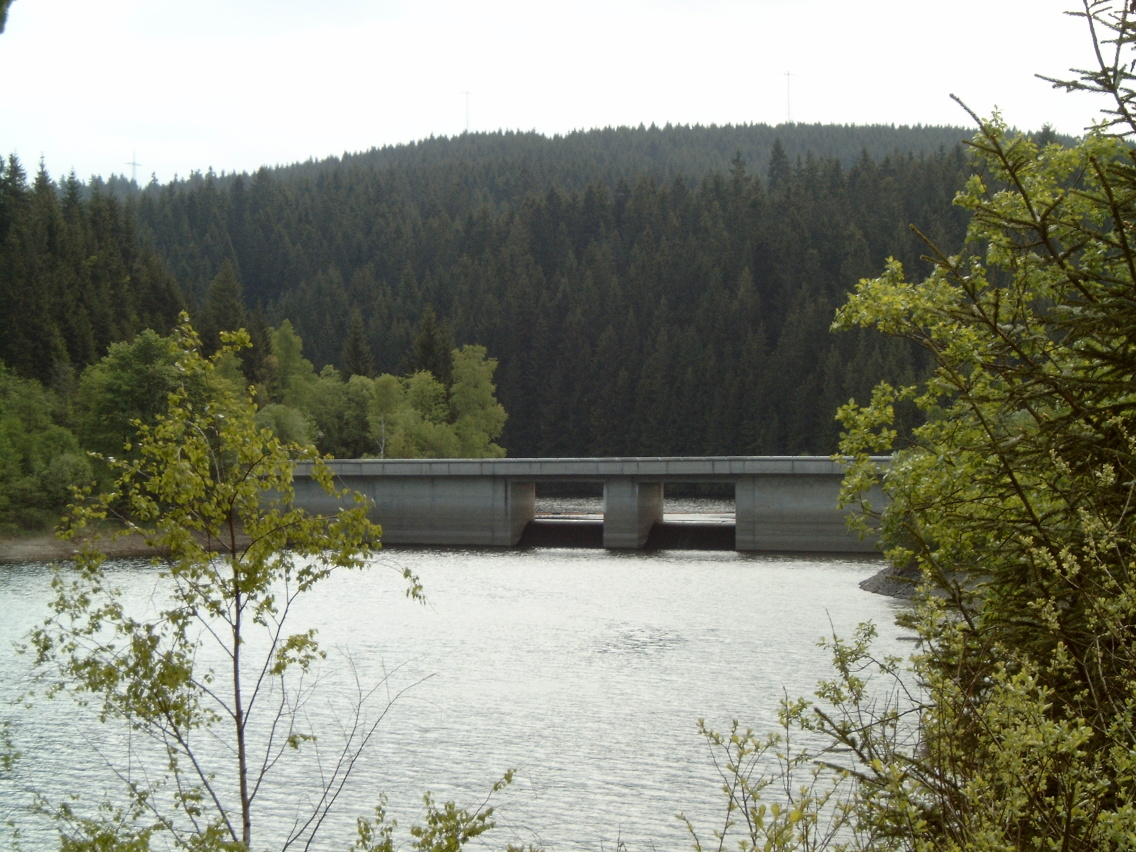
Pre-dam, Oker Reservoir side

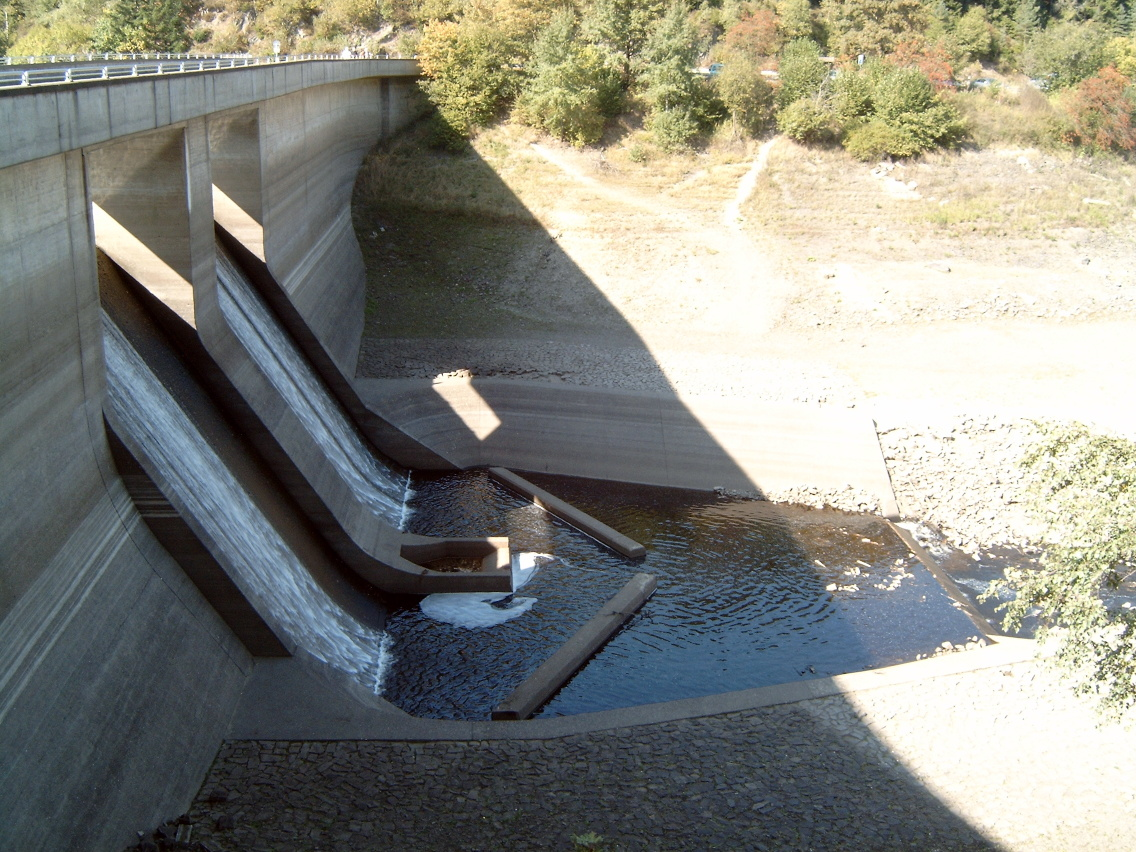
Pre-dam, Oker Reservoir side at low water

=== Bottom Outlet ===
The bottom outlet is used only for floods and is only opened in case the normal outlet (located below the Windenhaus) is unable to discharge the water through it. It consists of a 1.2 nominal diameter pipe with a screen, an inspection seal, a shutoff valve on the water side, and a piston valve on the airside. It has a maximum output capacity of 15 m³/s.

=== Spillway ===
It has a special type of spillway as it utilized the siphon effect. In case of overflow, the water reaches the level of the spillway and starts to discharge and continues to discharge after the water goes a bit lower. This has the advantage of being more sensitive to water rising with higher discharge. This spillway has only been used twice, once in 1981 and another in 1994.

The spillway consists of two groups of 2 groups of 4 pipes each, each pipe has a cross-section of 1.5 m² at a level of 416.60 m above sea level (Normalnull). Each pipe can push 10-15 m3 /s of water, making the spillway capacity roughly 120 m3 /s. Valves are also equipped to the pipes which can reduce the siphon effect in the case that is needed.

=== Romkerhalle Hydro-electric Power Station ===
The hydro-electric power station in Romkerhalle is fed via a pipe from the Oker Reservoir and has a capacity when completed of 4.14 MW. It was opened in 1956 and is equipped with a single Francis turbine. It has a descent of 80 m, the nominal discharge is 6.5 m³ per second and it generates 12.5 million kWh per year. The power station is operated as a peaking power plant working for about 8 hours per day. It discharges directly into the river bed of the Oker. At this point the whitewater section of the Oker begins and is especially popular with canoeists. Large and sometimes abrupt changes in water level on the Oker result from the unregulated flow of the power station from here as far as the stilling basin of the Oker Reservoir. The Romkerhalle power station is also called the Oker Hydro-Electric Power Station (Wasserkraftwerk Oker).

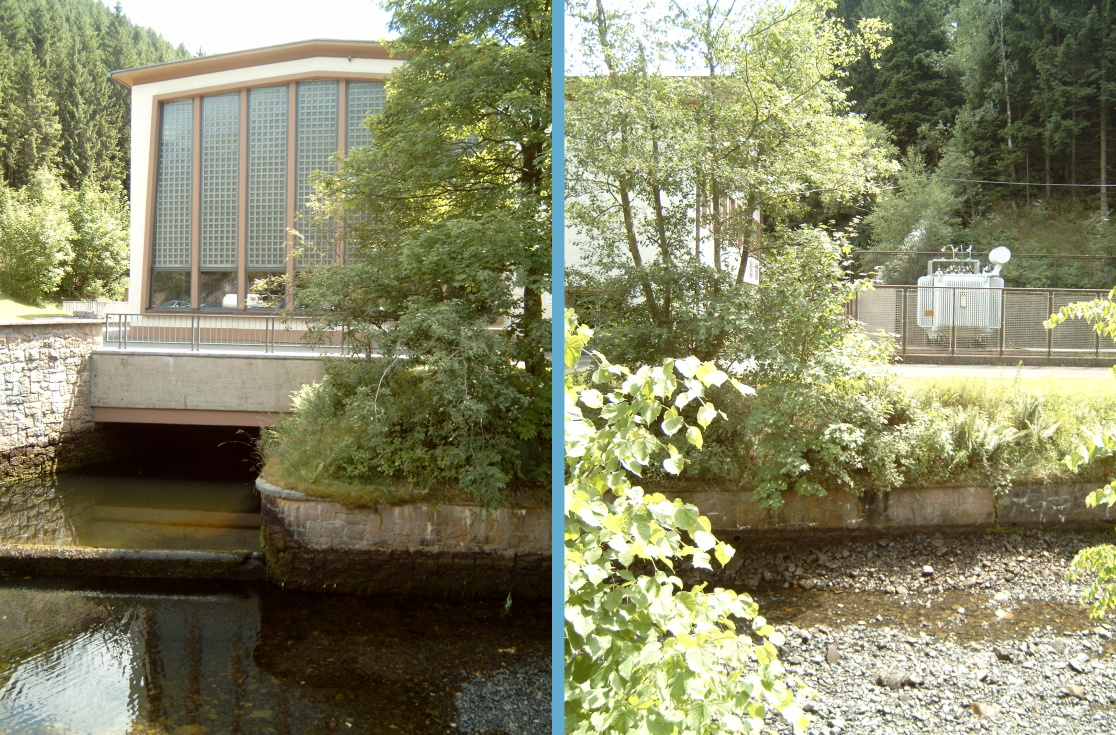
Romkerhalle Hydro-electric Power Station

=== Oker-Grane Tunnel ===
The 7.4 km long Oker-Grane Tunnel, with its intake near Romkerhalle and outlet on the eastern shore of the Grane Reservoir, conducts water from the Oker Reservoir (power station or bottom outlet) into the Grane Reservoir where it can be purified for use as drinking water. The Grane Reservoir itself only has a relatively small catchment area and is reliant on other tributaries in order to be able to supply drinking water. The Oker-Grane Tunnel was built in the period from 1968 to 1970.

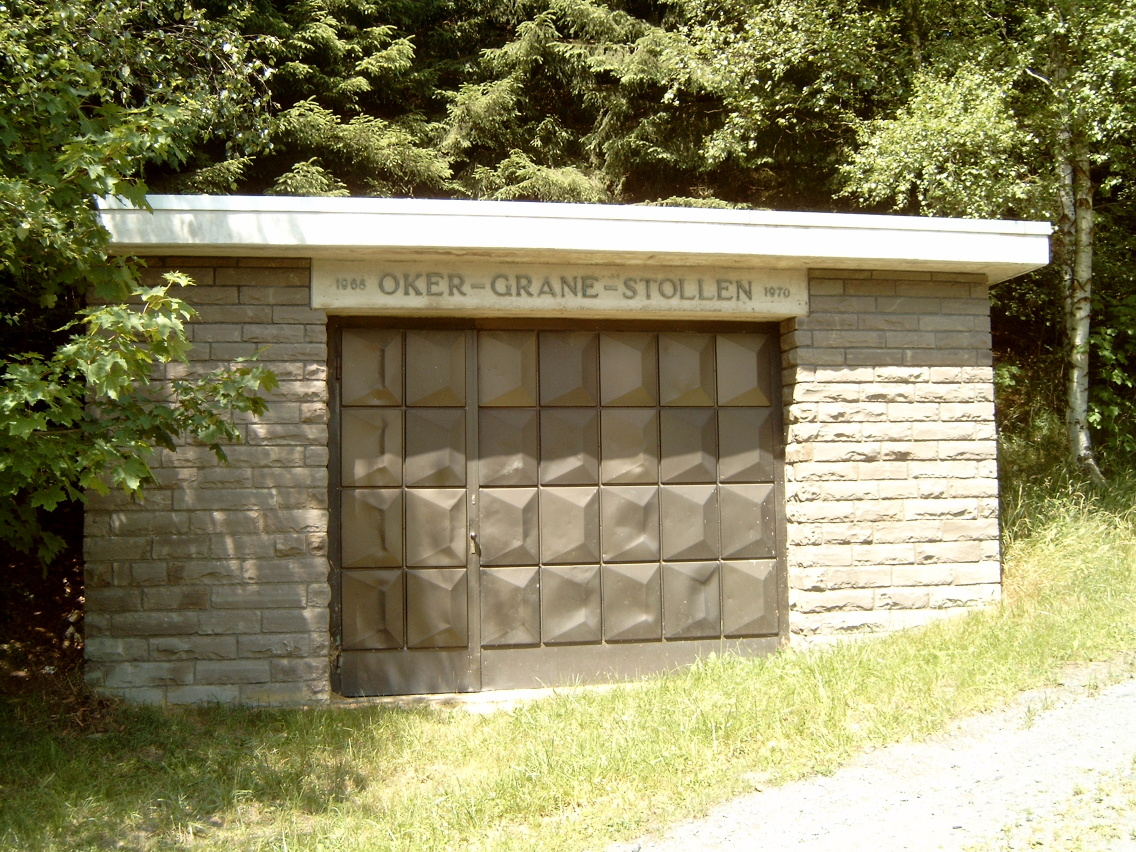
Oker-Grane tunnel, intake at Romkerhalle

=== Stilling basin ===
Oker Dam Stilling basin
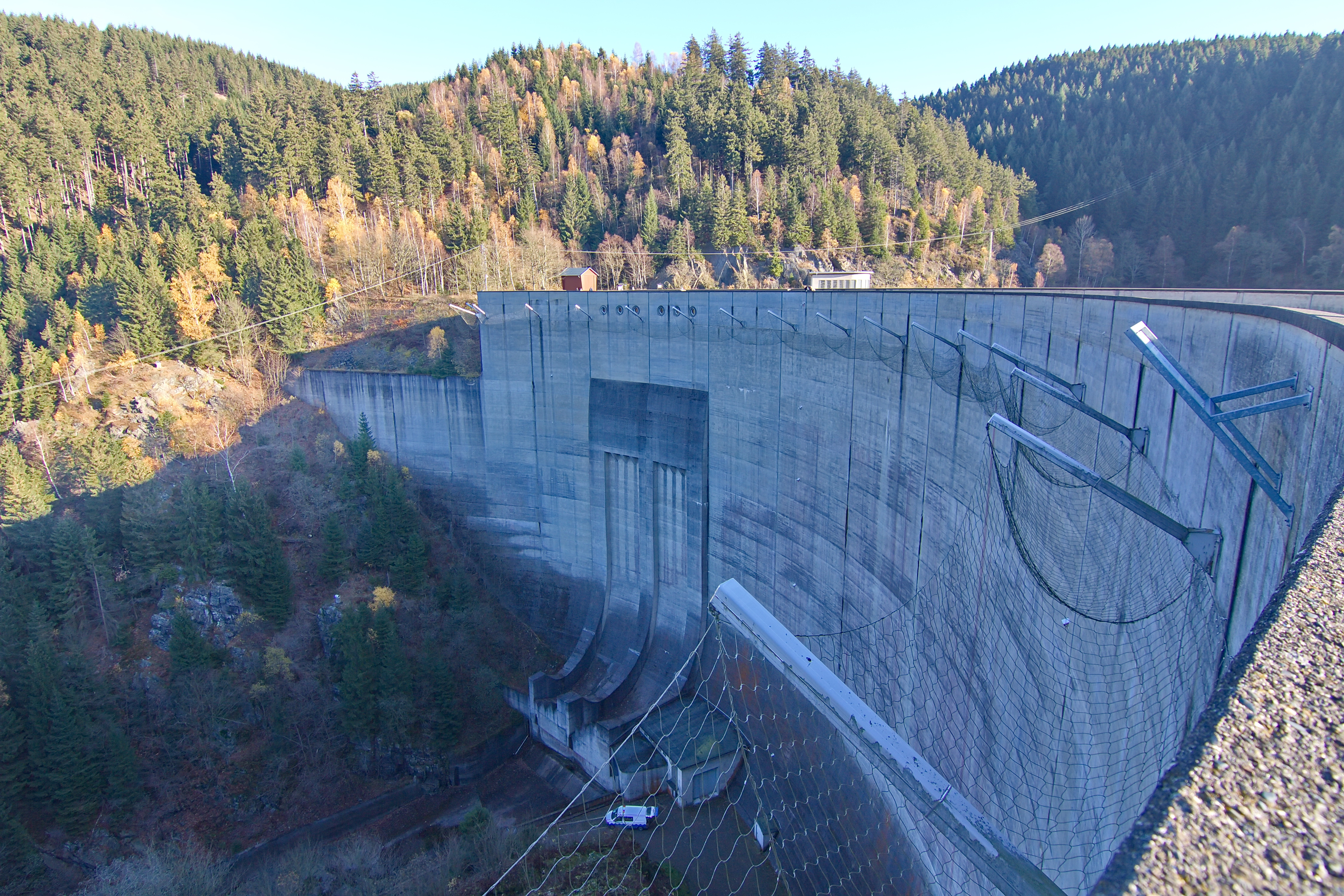
- Interactive map of Oker Dam Stilling basin
- Country: Germany
- Coordinates: 51°52′11″N 10°28′13″E
- Construction began: 1953
- Opening date: 1954

Dam and spillways
- Length: 78 m (256 ft)
- Dam volume: 7,800 m³

Reservoir
- Total capacity: 204,000 m³
- Surface area: 2 ha

The stilling basin at Oker Dam is a ski jump bucket basin, it is made of a basin structure with an end still.

The stilling basin lies about 3 km below the dam of the Oker Reservoir and about 2 km below the Romkerhalle power station. It is furnished with a gravity dam which has a height of 18 metres. The stilling basin can store up to 204,000 m³ of water and its main purpose is to regulate the water level downstream. There is no power station immediately below the dam wall, however it services several smaller power station on the Oker as far as the northern edge of the Harz. Like the Oker Reservoir, in calm weather conditions, it forms a very smooth water surface which reflects the surrounding countryside very clearly. Because of the sheltered location of the stilling basin, this phenomenon occurs very frequently.

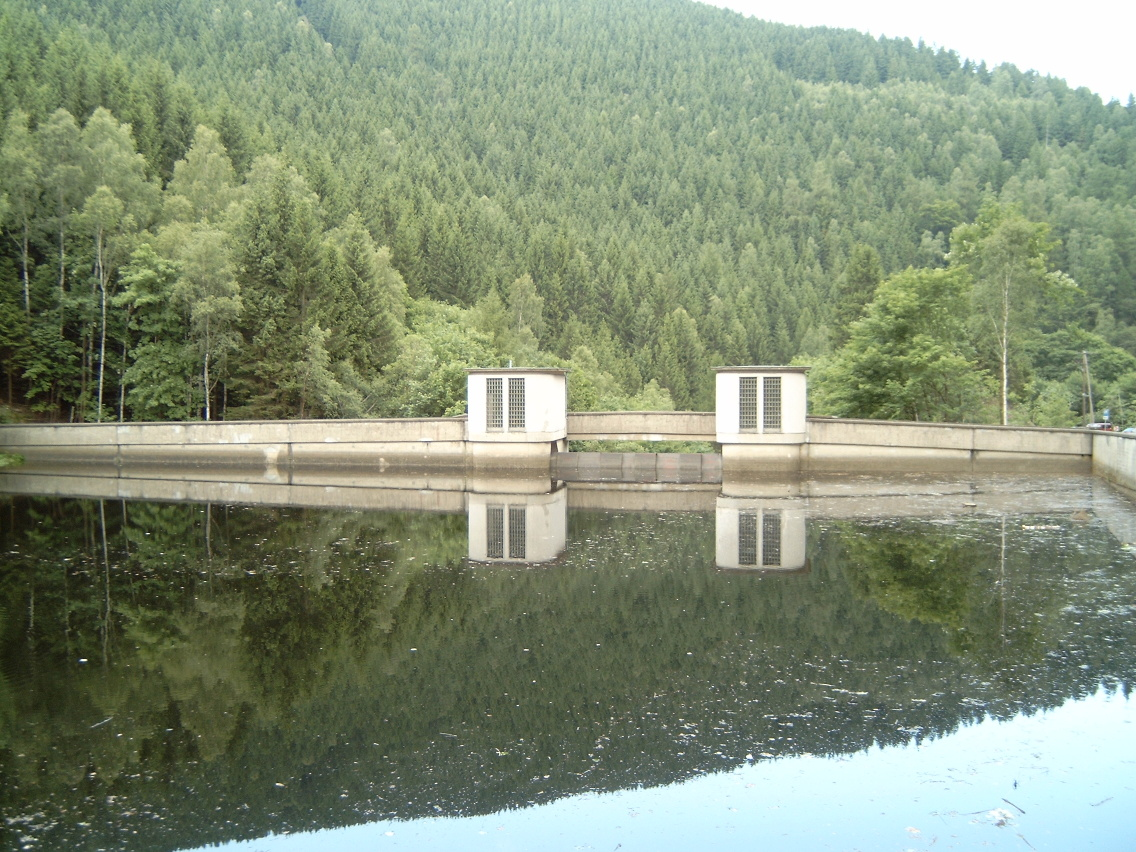
Stilling basin dam, upstream side

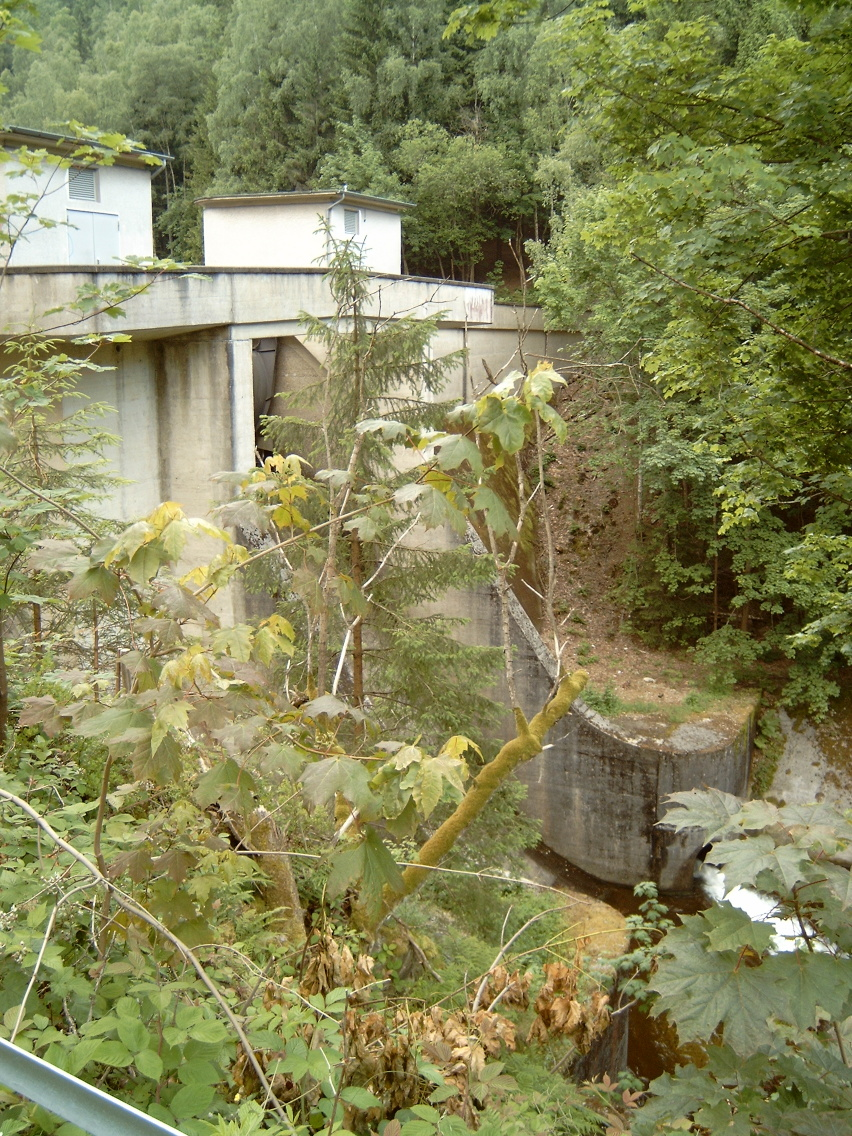
Stilling basin dam, downstream side

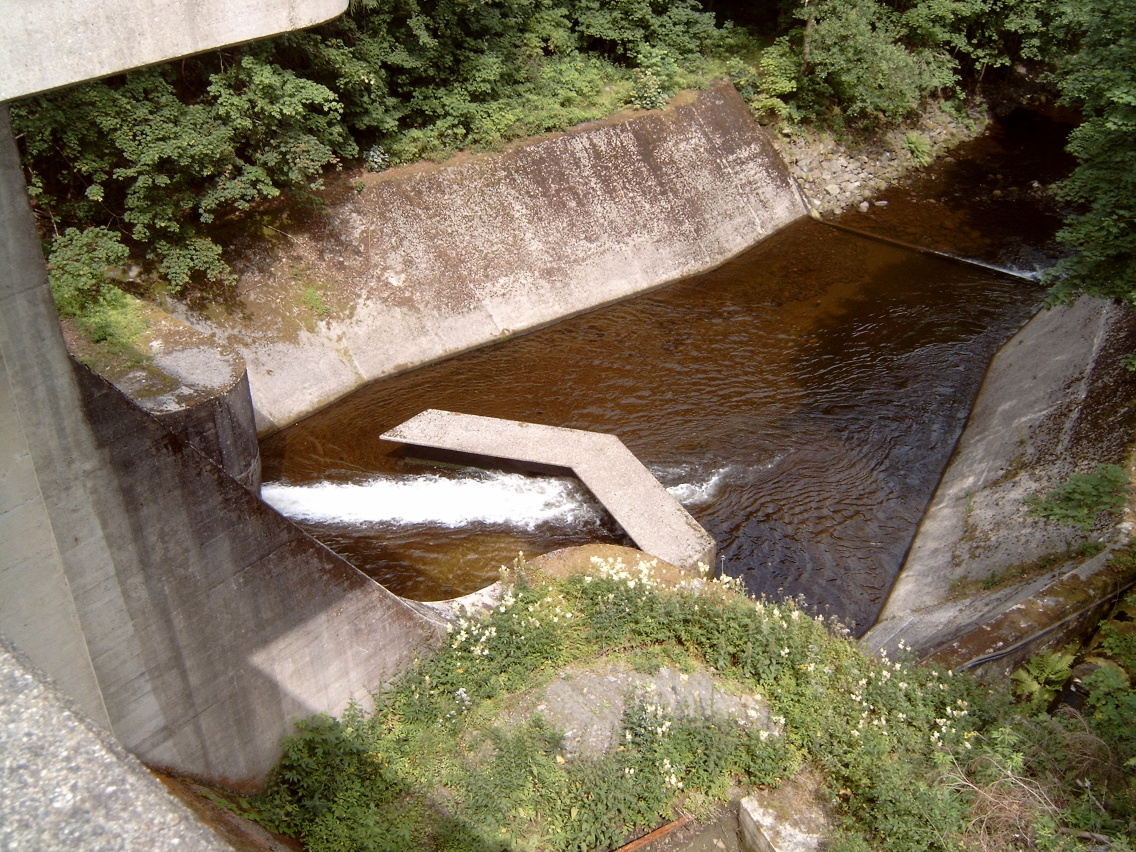
Stilling basin dam, deflector (Prallkörper)

=== Sewage ===
In order not to pollute the water in the reservoir unnecessarily, sewage from Altenau and Schulenberg is led away in a separate pipe around the Oker Reservoir to the Goslar-Oker sewage farm.

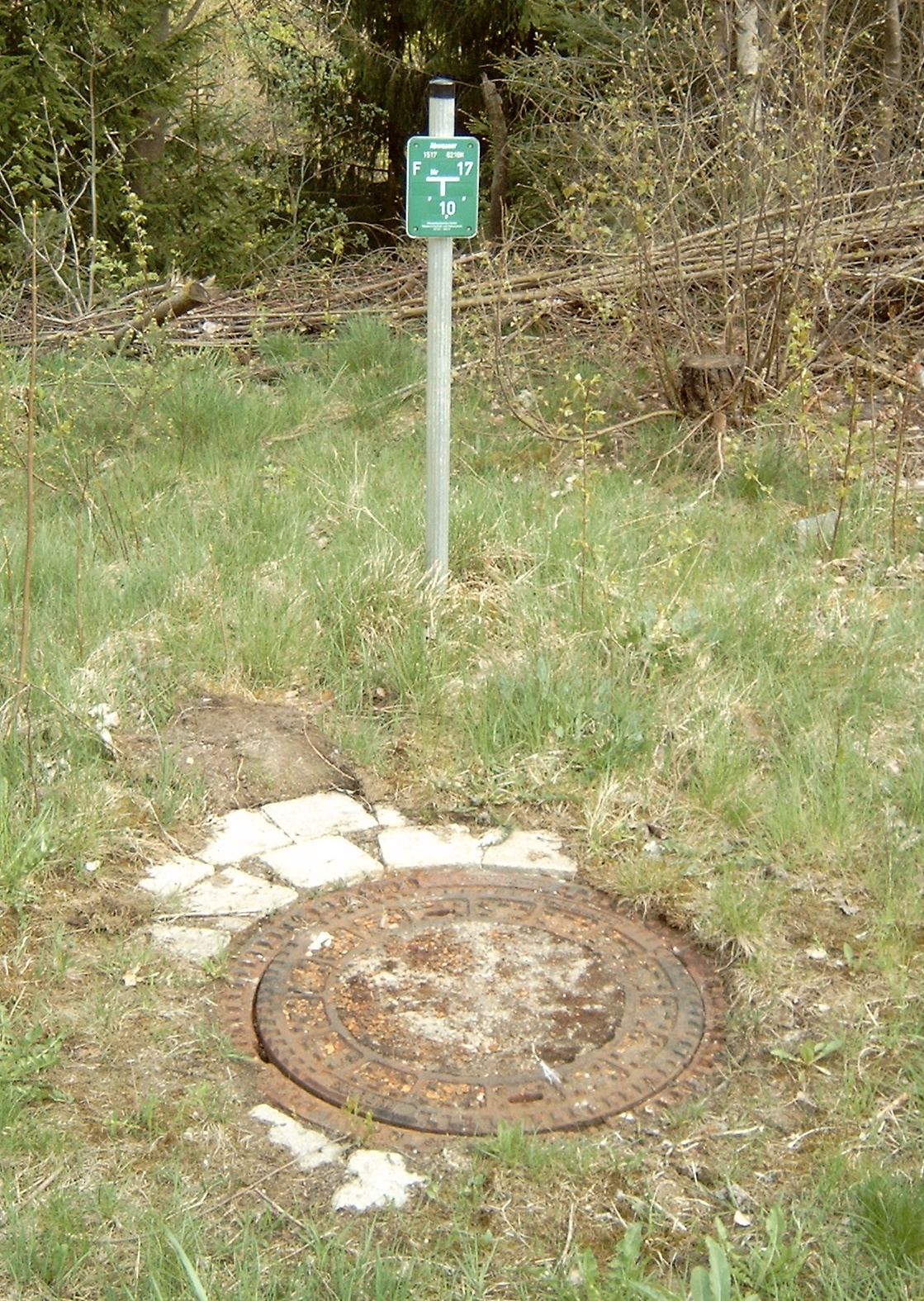
Sewage drain, access shaft between dam and Romkerhalle

== See also ==
- List of dams in the Harz
- List of reservoirs and dams in Germany

== Sources ==
- Peter Franke; Wolfgang Frey (1987), Talsperren in der Bundesrepublik Deutschland (in German), Berlin: Systemdruck, ISBN 3-926520-00-0
