= Schulenberg im Oberharz =

Village in Lower Saxony, Germany

- Stadtteil of Clausthal-Zellerfeld
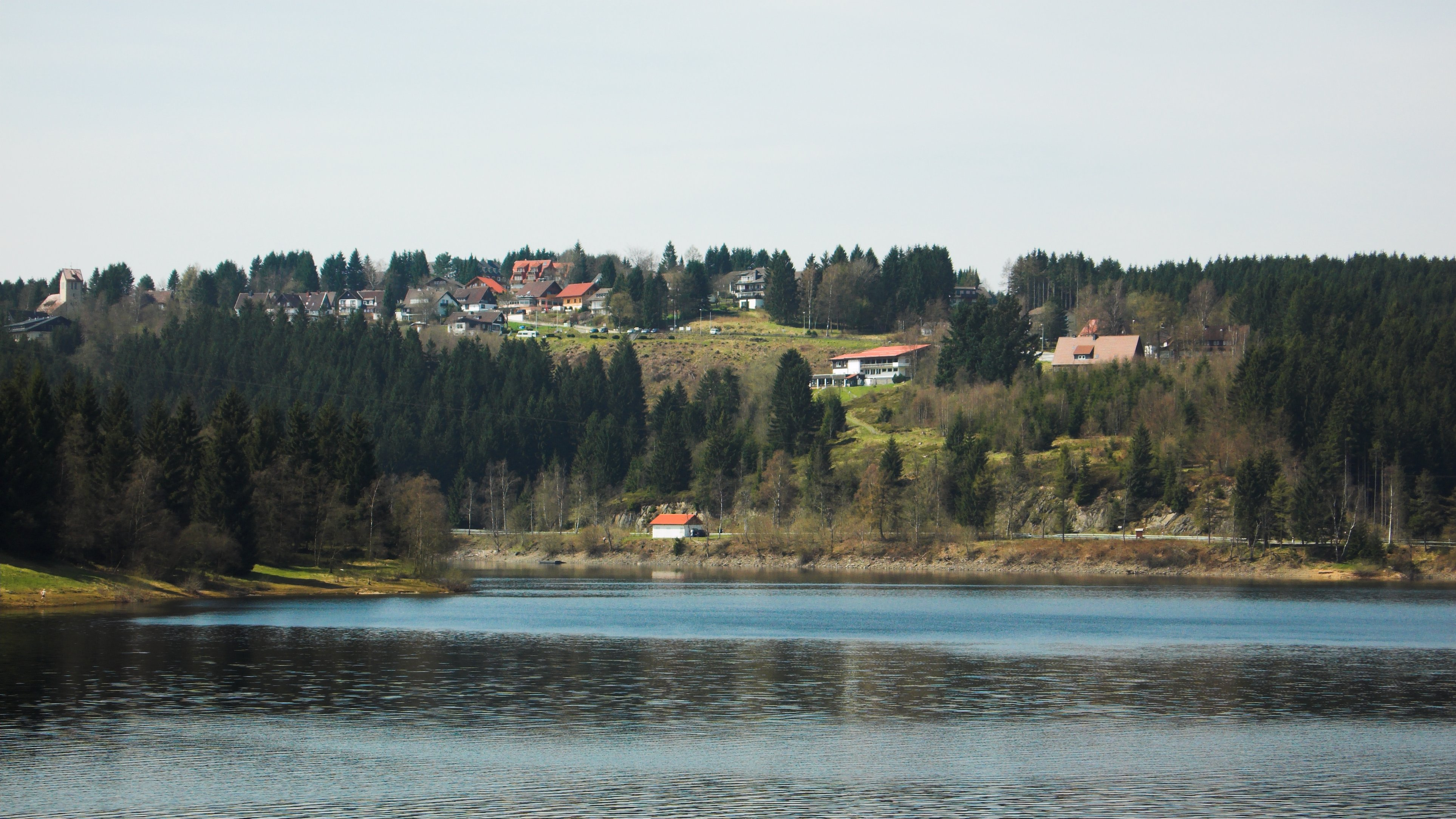
- Schulenberg seen from the Oker Dam

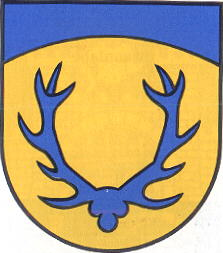
- Coat of arms
- Interactive map of Schulenberg im Oberharz
- Location within Germany Location within Lower Saxony
- Coordinates: 51°50′10″N 10°26′06″E
- Country: Germany
- State: Lower Saxony
- District: Goslar
- Town: Clausthal-Zellerfeld
- Subdivisions: 4 Ortsteile

Area
  - Total: 1.75 km^{2} (0.68 sq mi)
- Elevation: 490 m (1,610 ft)

Population (2013-12-31)
  - Total: 285
  - Density: 163/km^{2} (422/sq mi)
- Time zone: UTC+01:00 (CET)
  - Summer (DST): UTC+02:00 (CEST)
- Postal codes: 38707
- Dialling codes: 05329
- Vehicle registration: GS
- Website: www.samtgemeinde- oberharz.de

Schulenberg im Oberharz (German pronunciation: [ˌʃuːlənbɛʁk ʔɪm ˈʔoːbɐhaːɐ̯ts], lit. 'Schulenberg in the Upper Harz') is a village and a former municipality in the district of Goslar in Lower Saxony, Germany. It has been part of the town Clausthal-Zellerfeld since January 1, 2015.

== History ==
The former Schulenberg was a mining and hut settlement from the 16th century. The place was divided into the districts of Ober-, Mittel- and Unterschulenberg . The pits of the Schulenberg mining district were located a little above the village, mainly silver, copper and lead were mined. With the abandonment of the pits, the last and most productive of which was the Juliane Sophia mine in 1904, the main branch of the economy in Schulenberg was timber construction. Unterschulenberg was finally abandoned in 1954 and the building was torn down to the ground to make way for the newly built Oker dam. The citizens found a new home on the Kleiner Wiesenberg to the west of their old home. Today's Schulenberg, about 60 meters above the reservoir, was built there, significantly influenced by the architect Carl Bauer . From 1956 the Oker dam was flooded. The status of a climatic health resort was given up at the end of 2010. On January 1, 2015, the community of Schulenberg in the Upper Harz was dissolved.
