= Einsiedel Dam =

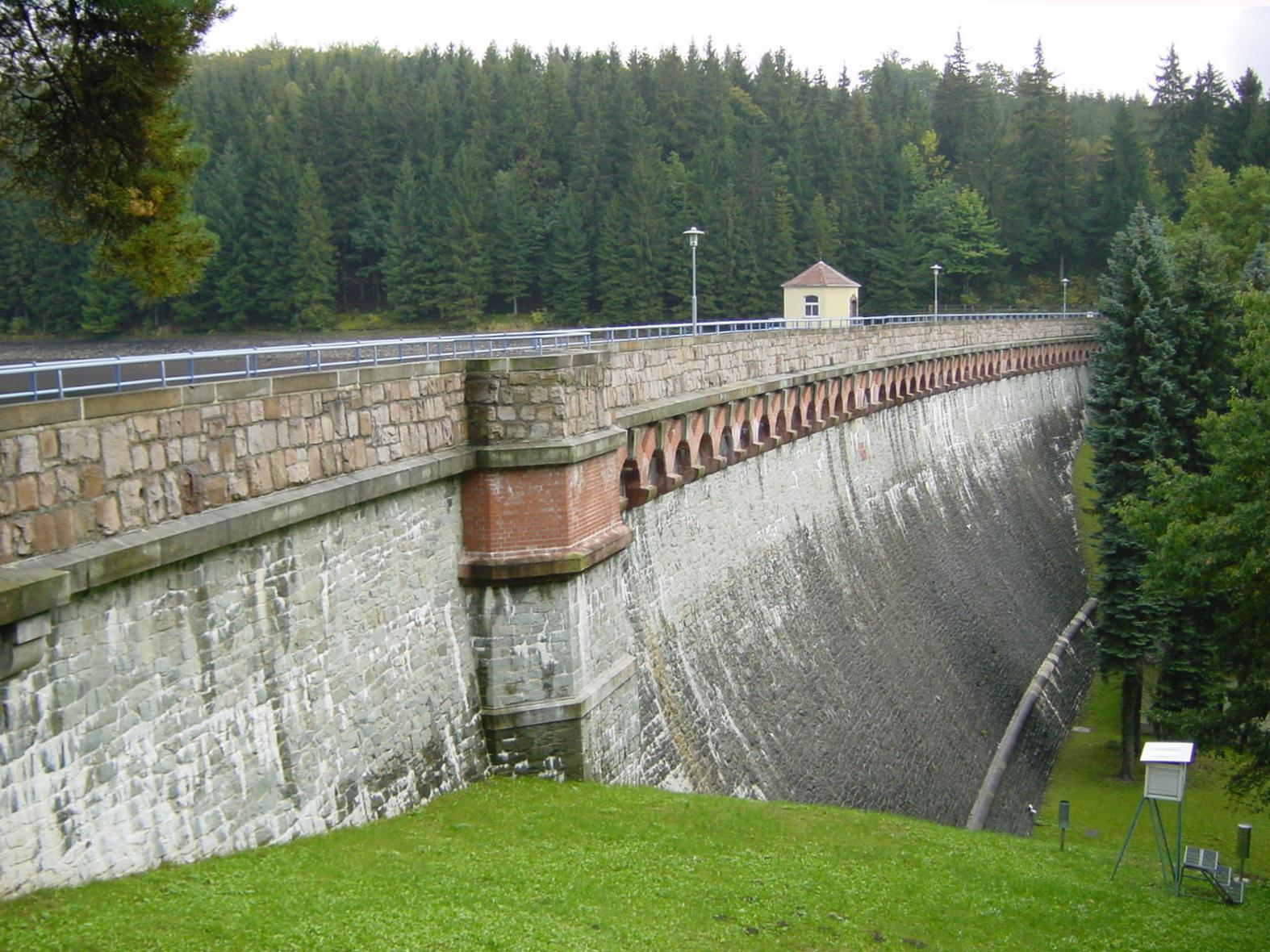
- Einsiedel Dam
- Interactive map of Einsiedel Dam
- Location: Saxony, Germany (near Chemnitz)
- Coordinates: 50.77472°N 12.98222°E
- Construction began: 1891–1894

Dam and spillways
- Height (foundation): 29 m (95 ft)
- Height (thalweg): 22 m (72 ft)
- Length: 180 m (590 ft)
- Elevation at crest: 384.44
- Width (crest): 4 m (13 ft)
- Dam volume: 23,600 m^{3} (830,000 cu ft)

Reservoir
- Total capacity: 0.325×10^{9} m^{3} (11.5×10^{9} cu ft)
- Active capacity: 0.3×10^{9} m^{3} (11×10^{9} cu ft)
- Catchment area: 2.7 km^{2} (1.0 sq mi)
- Surface area: 0.04
- Normal elevation: 383.75 m (1,259.0 ft)

Einsiedel Dam (German: Talsperre Einsiedel) is located in the German Free State of Saxony. Its reservoir supplies drinking water to Chemnitz and, in conjunction with the Central Ore Mountains reservoir system, that includes the reservoirs of Neunzehnhain I, II and Saidenbach also supplies water to the entire region covered by the South Saxony Long Distance Water Association (Zweckverband Fernwasser Südsachsen).

== Construction, use and history ==
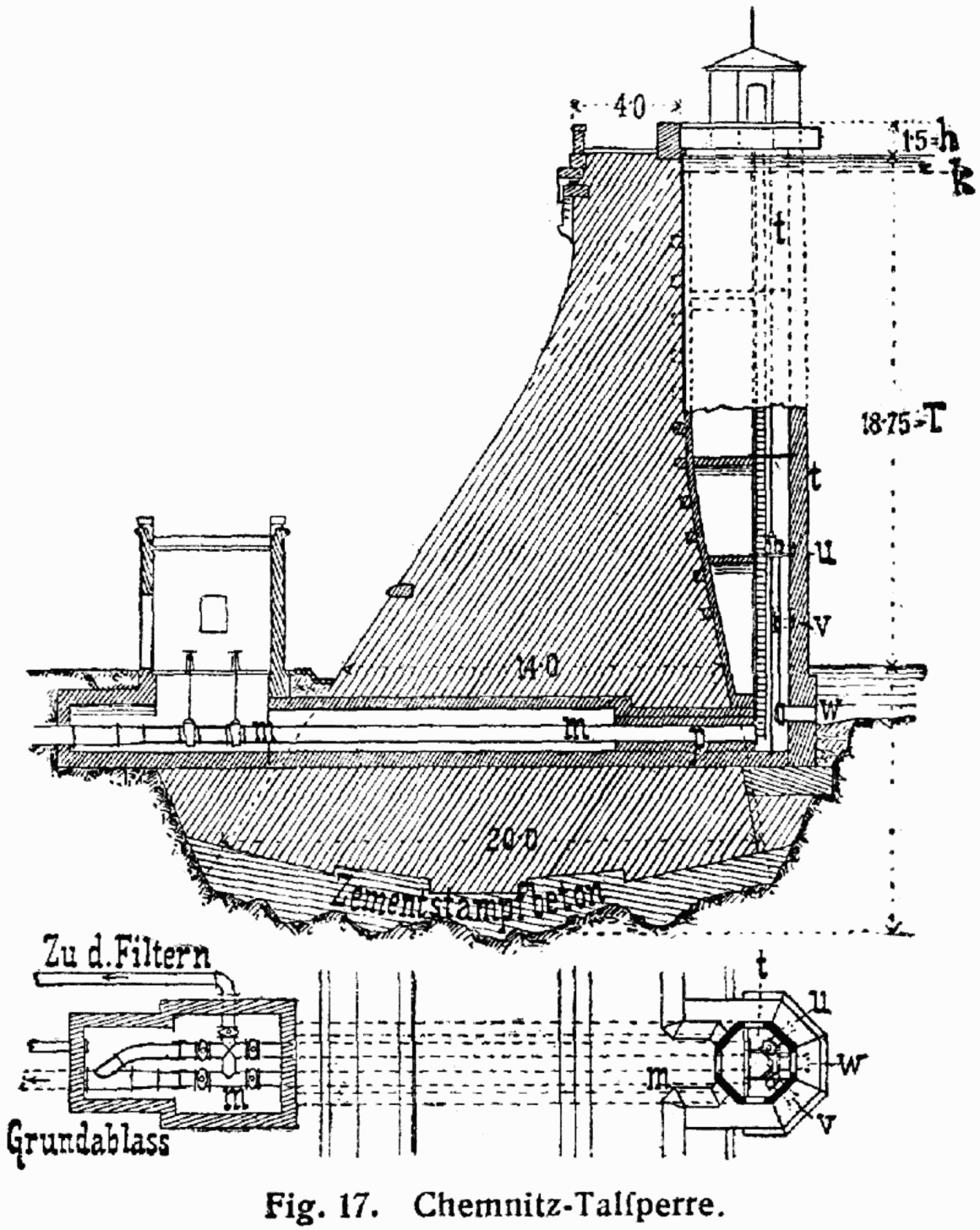
Section through the reservoir

In May 1883 the population of Chemnitz exceeded 100,000 and it became the 15th city in Germany. The supply of drinking water to the city had been provided by a waterworks built in 1872–1874, that could no longer cope with the increasing water consumption of the growing city. An increase in its capacity was no longer possible due to the limitations of terrain and rising pollution of the Zwönitz, which meant that the source of water supply had to be switched from ground to surface water. The local council of Einsiedel, which lay below the proposed dam, had unsuccessfully objected against the dam site in Stadtguttal in light of the breach of the South Fork Dam in 1889 that had caused approximately 2,200 deaths. Between 7 November 1890 (laying of the foundation stone) and 14 June 1894 (dam opening) the oldest drinking water-retaining dam in Saxony emerged which, after the Eschbach Dam and Panzer Dam, is also the third oldest in Germany. It cost 1.3 million marks and an average of 142 workers were employed in its construction. A water works was built below the dam that led the treated water through a 3.3 km long tunnel into Chemnitz's water supply network. At the time of commissioning the Einsiedel Dam was considered a technical masterpiece. It was assessed as excellent at the World Exhibitions in Paris (1900) and St. Louis. The Einsiedel barrage is a curved gravity dam made of quarrystone, based partly on the Intze principle, but without the Intze wedge, retaining wall drainage and water-side protective layer (facing). It is a "large dam" by ICOLD criteria and impounds the waters of the Stadtguttalbach, it also receives water channeled from the Neunzehnhain I Reservoir. The reservoir is used for drinking water, which is why swimming, fishing and recreational sports, etc., are not permitted in the reservoir. The dam is also used to a limited extent for flood control.

== See also ==
- List of dams and reservoirs in Germany

== Sources ==
- Dieter Bock: 100 Jahre Talsperre Einsiedel bei Chemnitz. in: Erzgebirgische Heimatblätter. Heft 5/1994. p. 25–26, ISSN 0232-6078
