= Quitzdorf Dam =

Dam in Germany

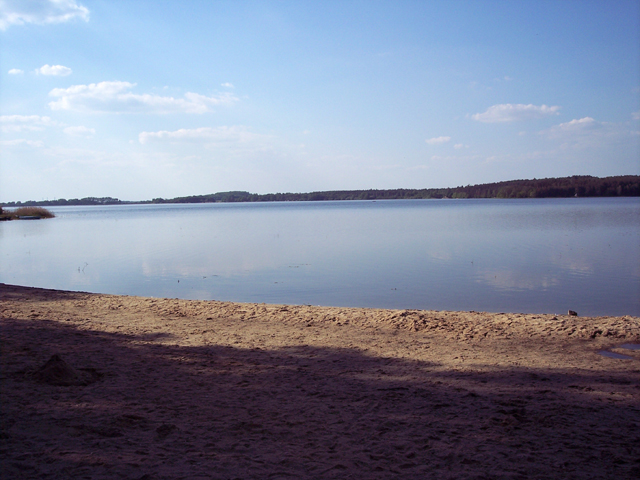

- Location within Saxony
- Official name: Talsperre Quitzdorf
- Country: Germany
- Location: Görlitz, Saxony
- Coordinates: 51°16′42″N 14°45′42″E
- Construction began: 1965
- Opening date: 1972

Dam and spillways
- Height (foundation): 11.14 metres (36.5 ft)
- Height (thalweg): 10.5 metres (34 ft)
- Length: 1,400 metres (4,600 ft)
- Elevation at crest: 162.62 metres (533.5 ft)
- Width (crest): 4 metres (13 ft)
- Dam volume: 200,000 cubic metres (7,100,000 ft^{3})

Reservoir
- Total capacity: 22,020,000 cubic metres (778,000,000 ft^{3})
- Surface area: 750 hectares (1,900 acres)
- Normal elevation: 160.1 metres (525 ft)

Quitzdorf Dam (German: Talsperre Quitzdorf; Upper Sorbian: Kwětanečanska rěčna zawěra Kwětanecy) is a dam near Quitzdorf am See, Germany. It is located in the municipality of Quitzdorf am See in the Upper Lusatia region of Saxony. The lake is used for service water supply, flood protection, low water elevation, recreation and nature conservation. In terms of area, it is the largest reservoir in Saxony and was the largest inland water body in Saxony until the Lohsa II and Bärwalde reservoirs were flooded. According to criteria established by the International Commission on Large Dams, it is a large dam.

== Tourism ==
Many of the lake's shores have been redeveloped after the reunification of Germany and sandy beaches have been created. There are two campsites by the lake and numerous accommodation facilities. Near the shore, a 17.5 kilometres (10.9 mi) long circular path has been built, which is asphalted throughout and car-free.

The reservoir has had persistent problems with cyanobacteria. As of 2020, a comprehensive refurbishment is in the planning phase.

== Gallery ==
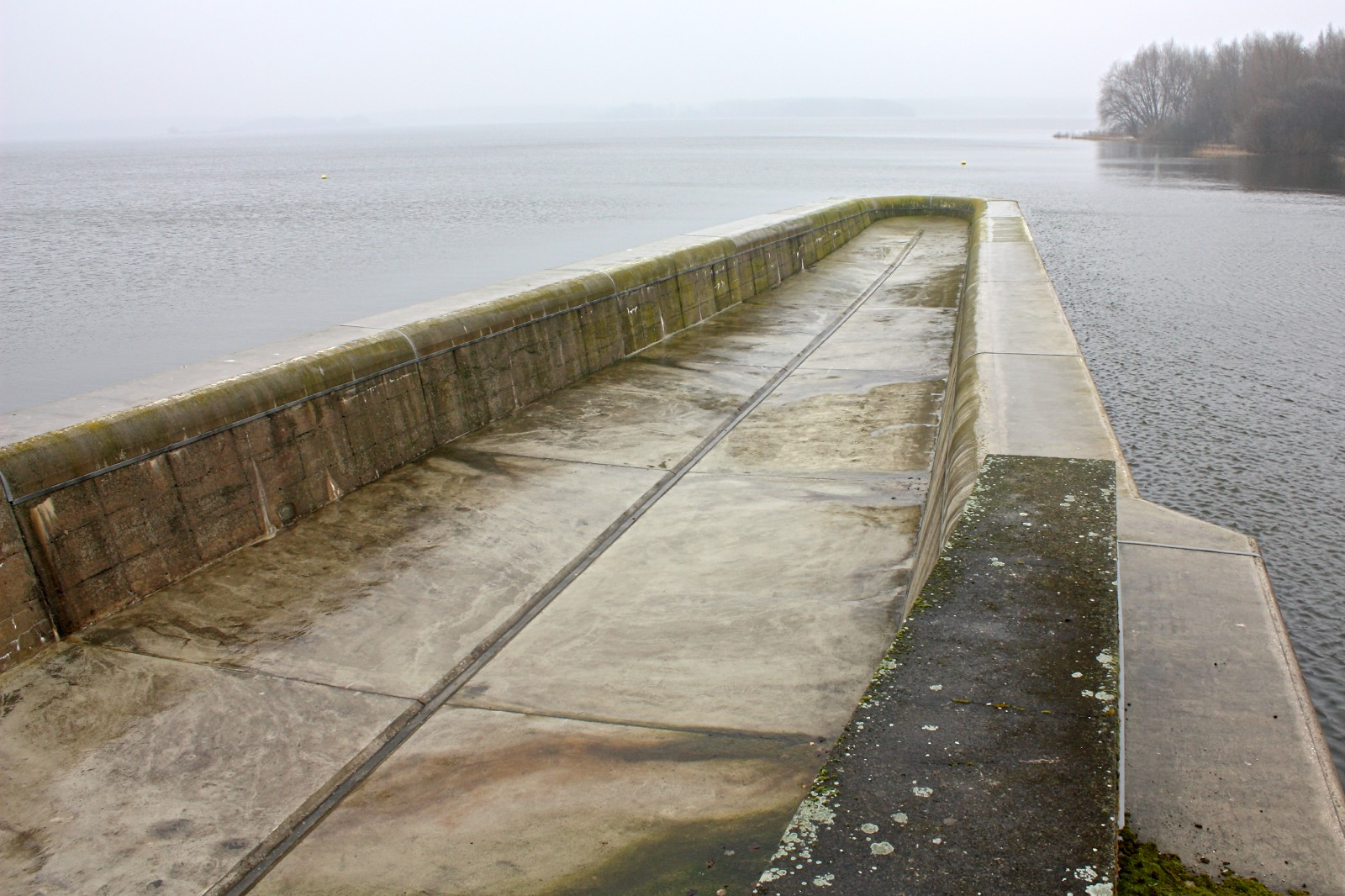
Overflow of the spillway

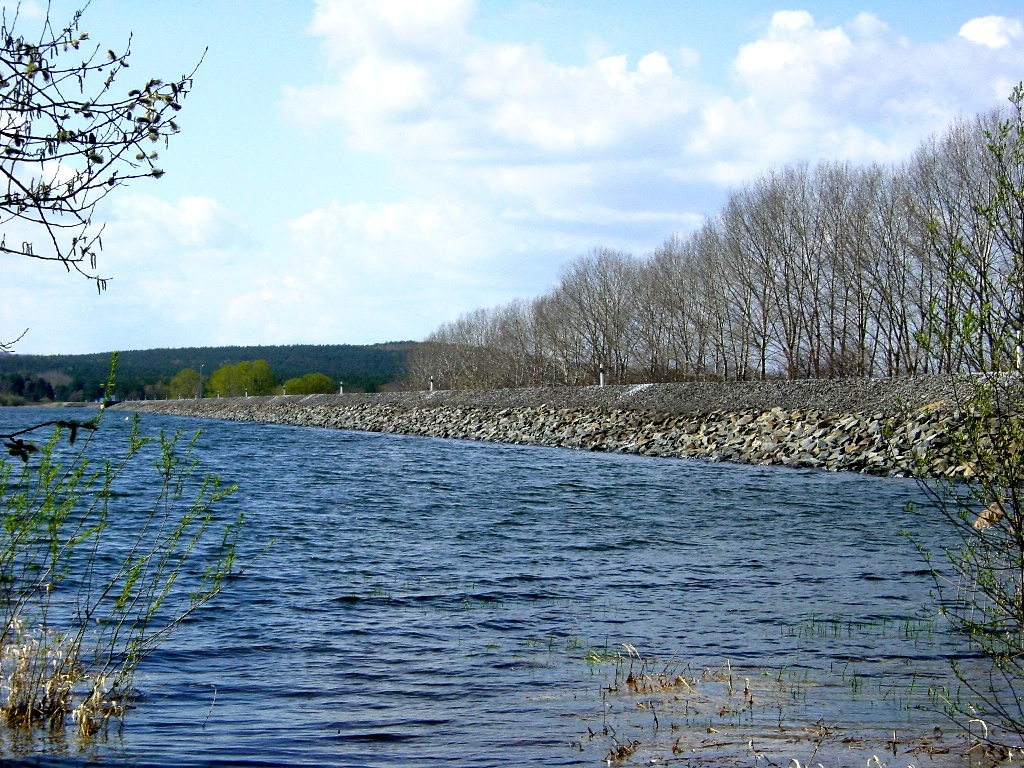
Dam (2008)

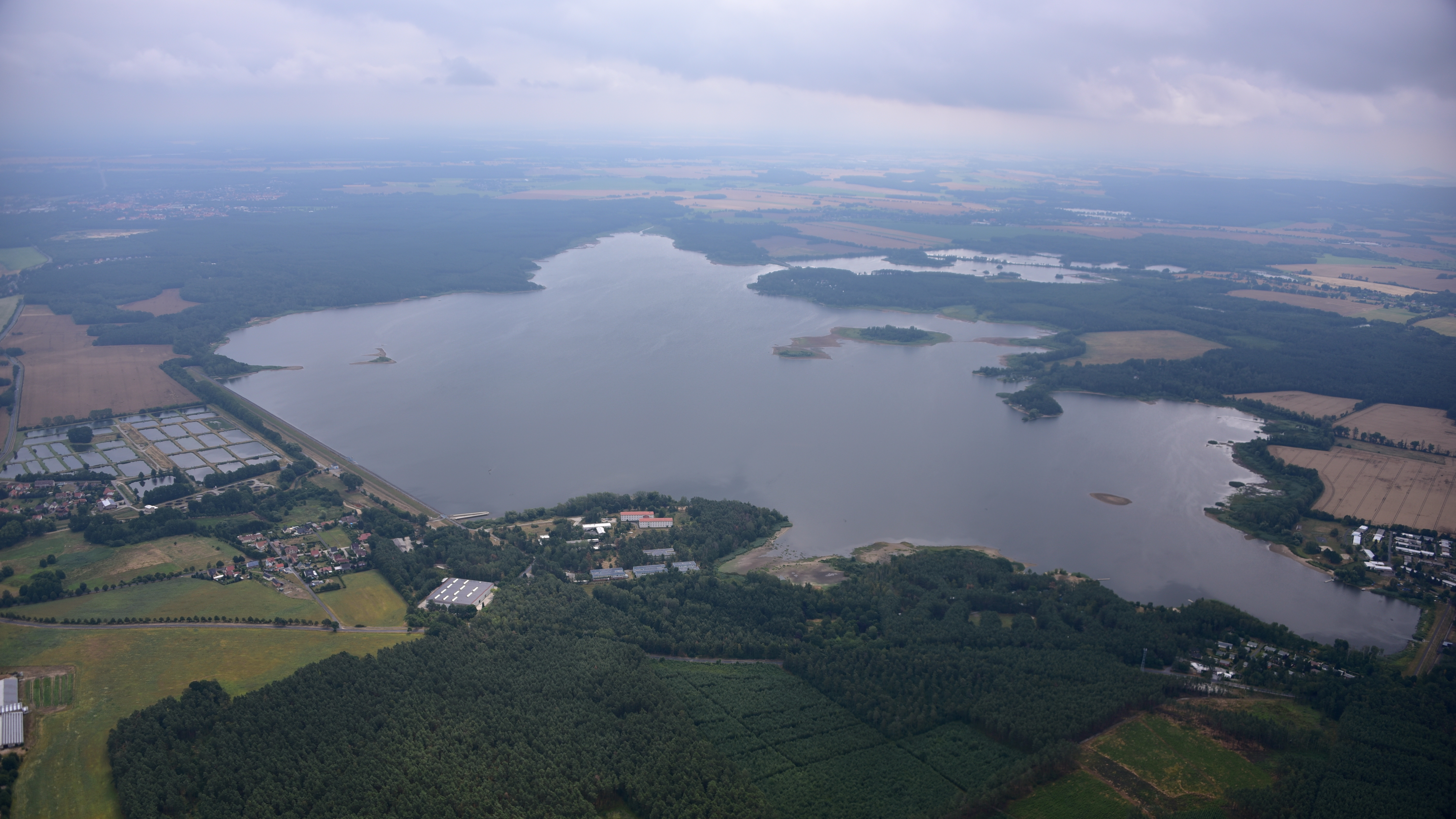
Aerial view of reservoir (2019)

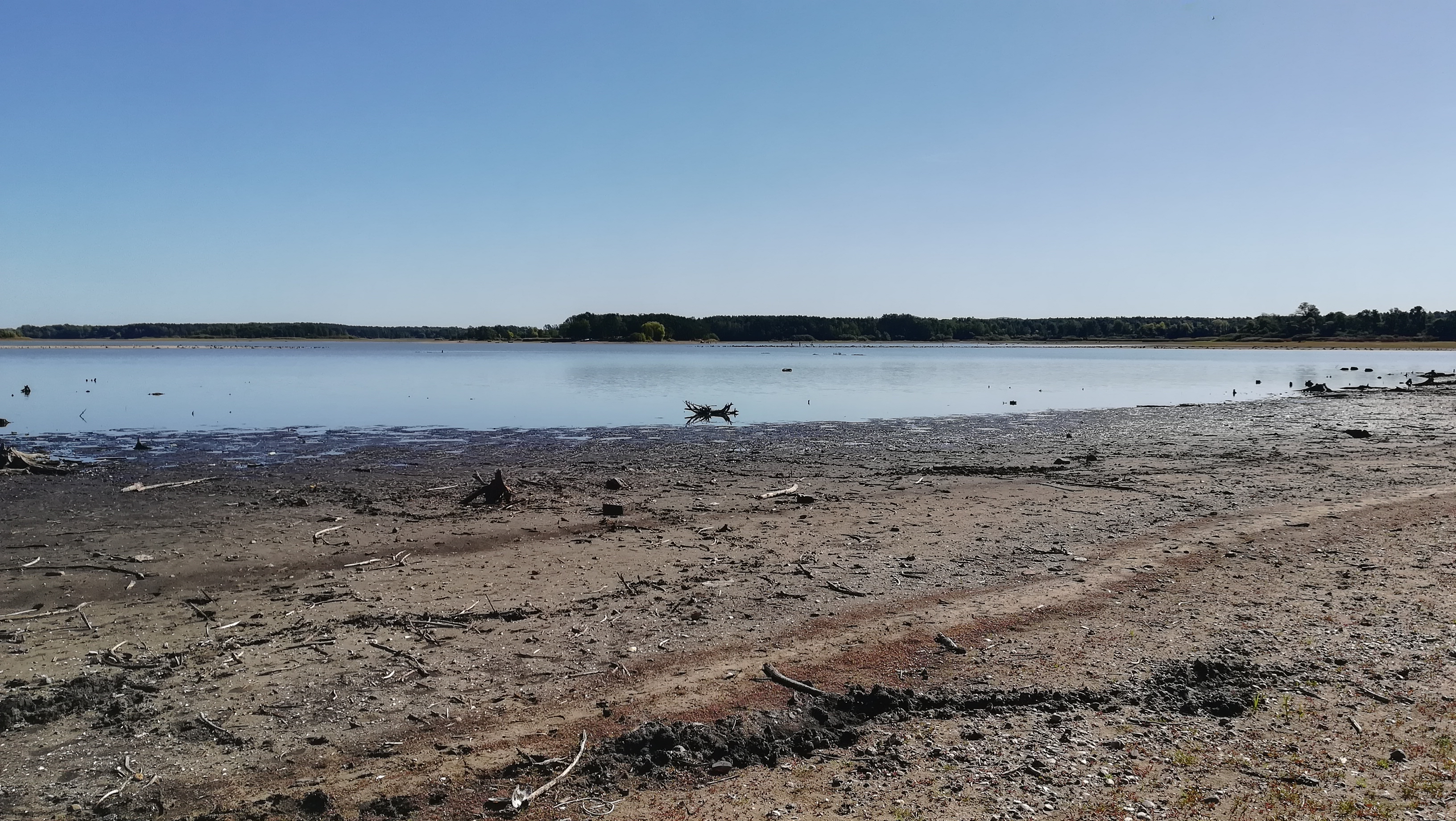
Quitzdorf reservoir while half-drained

== See also ==
- List of dams and reservoirs in Germany
