= Lohsa =

Lohsa/Łaz
- Municipality
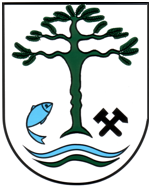
- Coat of arms

- Location of Lohsa/Łaz within Bautzen district
- Interactive map of Lohsa/Łaz
- Location within Germany Location within Saxony
- Coordinates: 51°23′2″N 14°24′12″E
- Country: Germany
- State: Saxony
- District: Bautzen

Government
  - Mayor (2023–30): Thomas Leberecht (CDU)

Area
  - Total: 134.53 km^{2} (51.94 sq mi)
- Elevation: 114 m (374 ft)

Population (2025-12-31)
  - Total: 4,937
  - Density: 36.70/km^{2} (95.05/sq mi)
- Time zone: UTC+01:00 (CET)
  - Summer (DST): UTC+02:00 (CEST)
- Postal codes: 02999
- Dialling codes: 035724/035726
- Vehicle registration: BZ, BIW, HY, KM
- Website: Einheitsgemeinde Lohsa

Lohsa (German, pronounced [ˈloːza]) or Łaz (Upper Sorbian, pronounced [ˈwas]) is a municipality in the district of Bautzen, in Saxony, in eastern Germany.

The municipality is part of the recognized Sorbian settlement area in Saxony. Upper Sorbian has an official status next to German, all villages bear names in both languages.

== Demographics ==
The Sorbian population of the village was 358 in 1840, 355 in 1860, and 400 in 1880.

== Villages ==
Several villages belong to the municipality (names given in German/Upper Sorbian):

- Dreiweibern/Tři Žony
- Driewitz/Drěwcy
- Friedersdorf/Bjedrichecy
- Groß Särchen/Wulke Ždźary
- Hermsdorf/Spree/Hermanecy
- Koblenz/Koblicy
- Lippen/Lipiny
- Litschen/Złyčin
- Lohsa/Łaz
- Mortka/Mortkow
- Riegel/Roholń
- Steinitz/Šćeńca
- Tiegling/Tyhelc
- Weißig/Wysoka
- Weißkollm/Běły Chołmc

== Economy and Infrastructure ==
=== Education ===
The municipality of Lohsa has a primary school in Groß Särchen and a secondary school.

=== Traffic ===
To the east of the municipality runs the B 156, to the west the B 96, via which the B 97 to the northwest can be reached.

Lohsa/Łaz railway station is connected to the Niesky-Hoyerswerda(-Falkenberg (Elster)-Roßlau (Elbe)) railway line by a demand stop. The RB 64 line (Hoyerswerda-Görlitz) operates here as the Seenland-Neisse-Shuttle.

== Notable people ==
- Handrij Zejler (1804–1872), Sorbian writer and activist, lived and died in Łaz
- Martha Israel (1905–c. 1967), politician

== Gallery ==
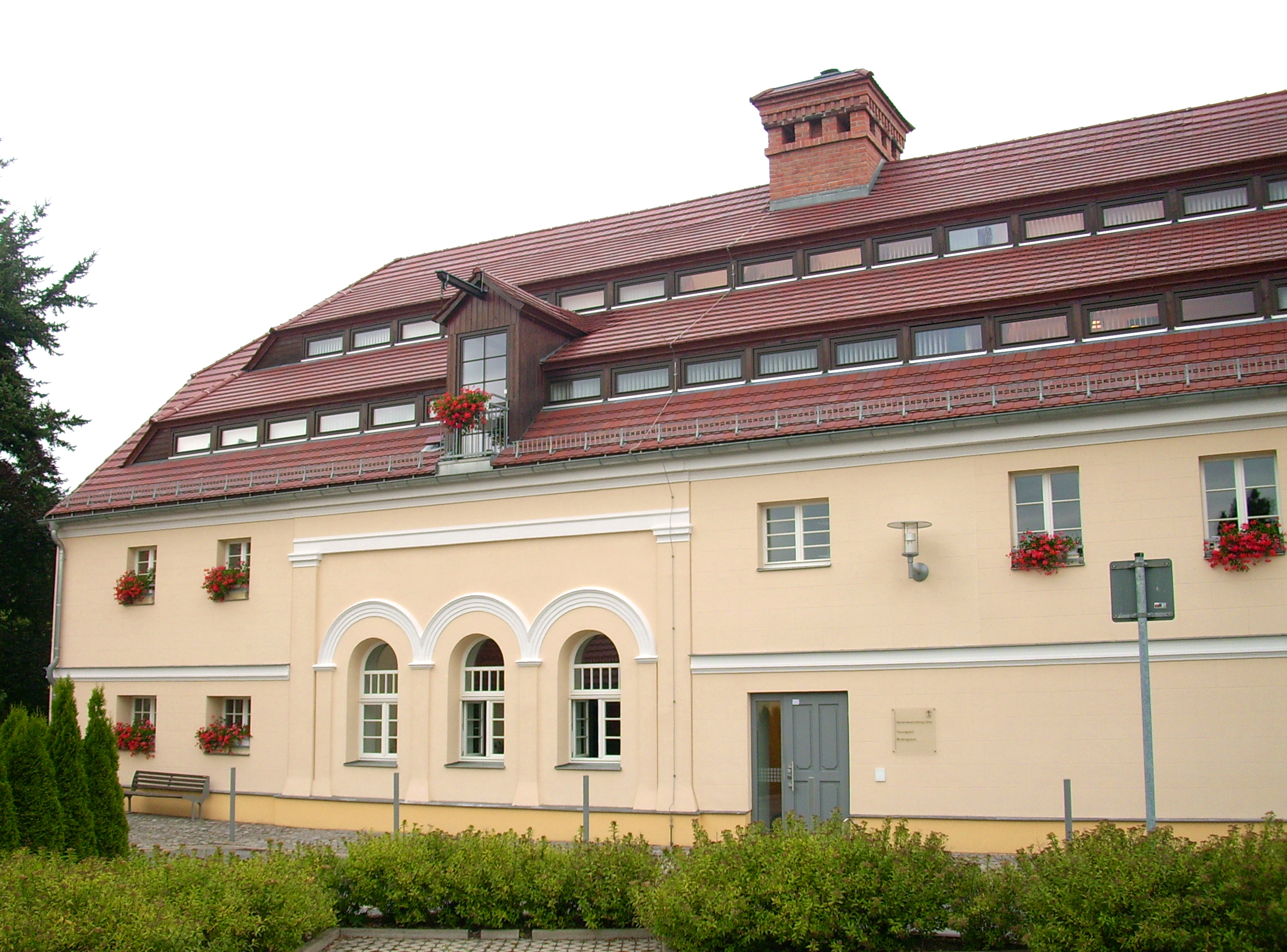
Municipal building

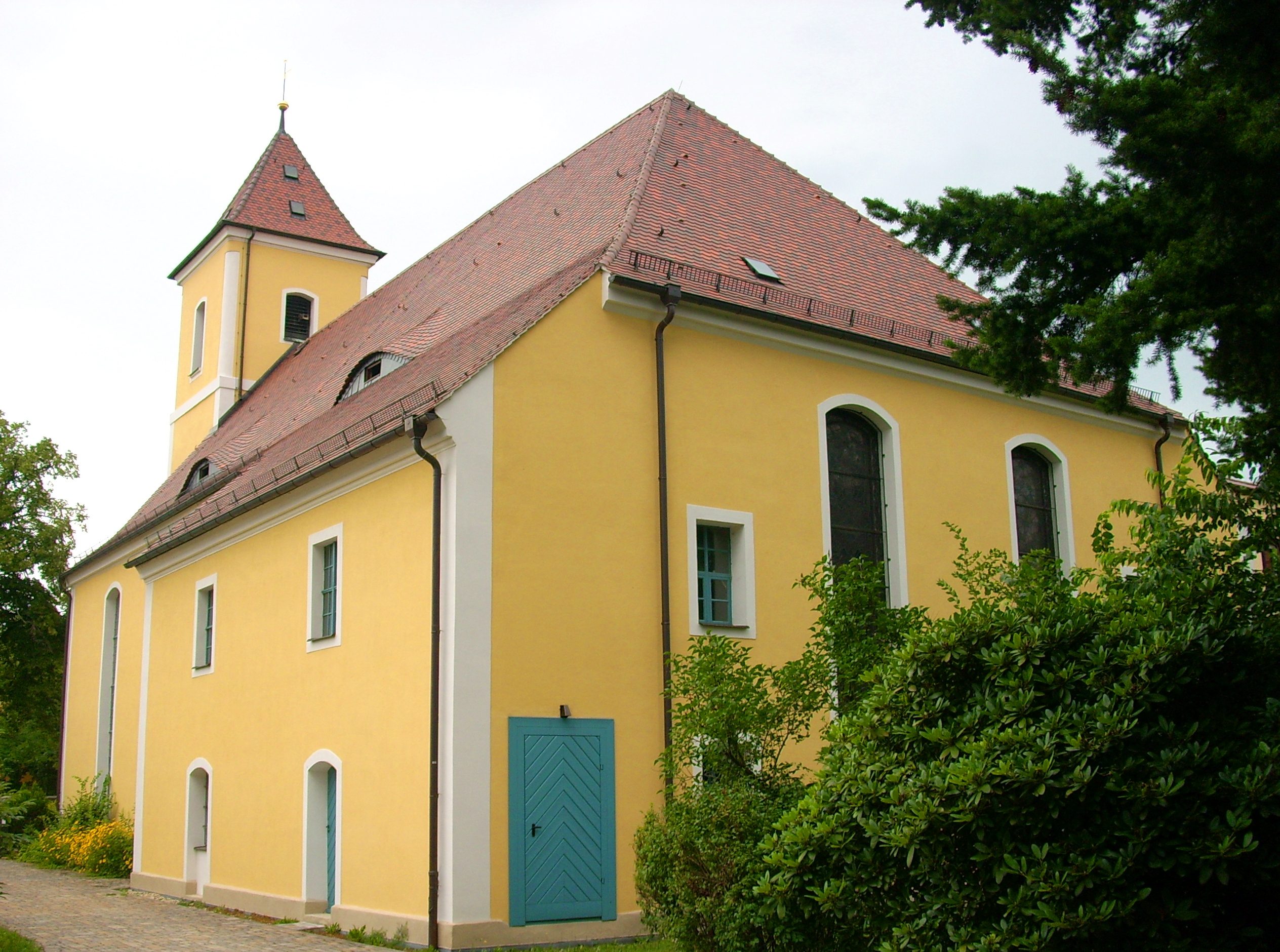
Church

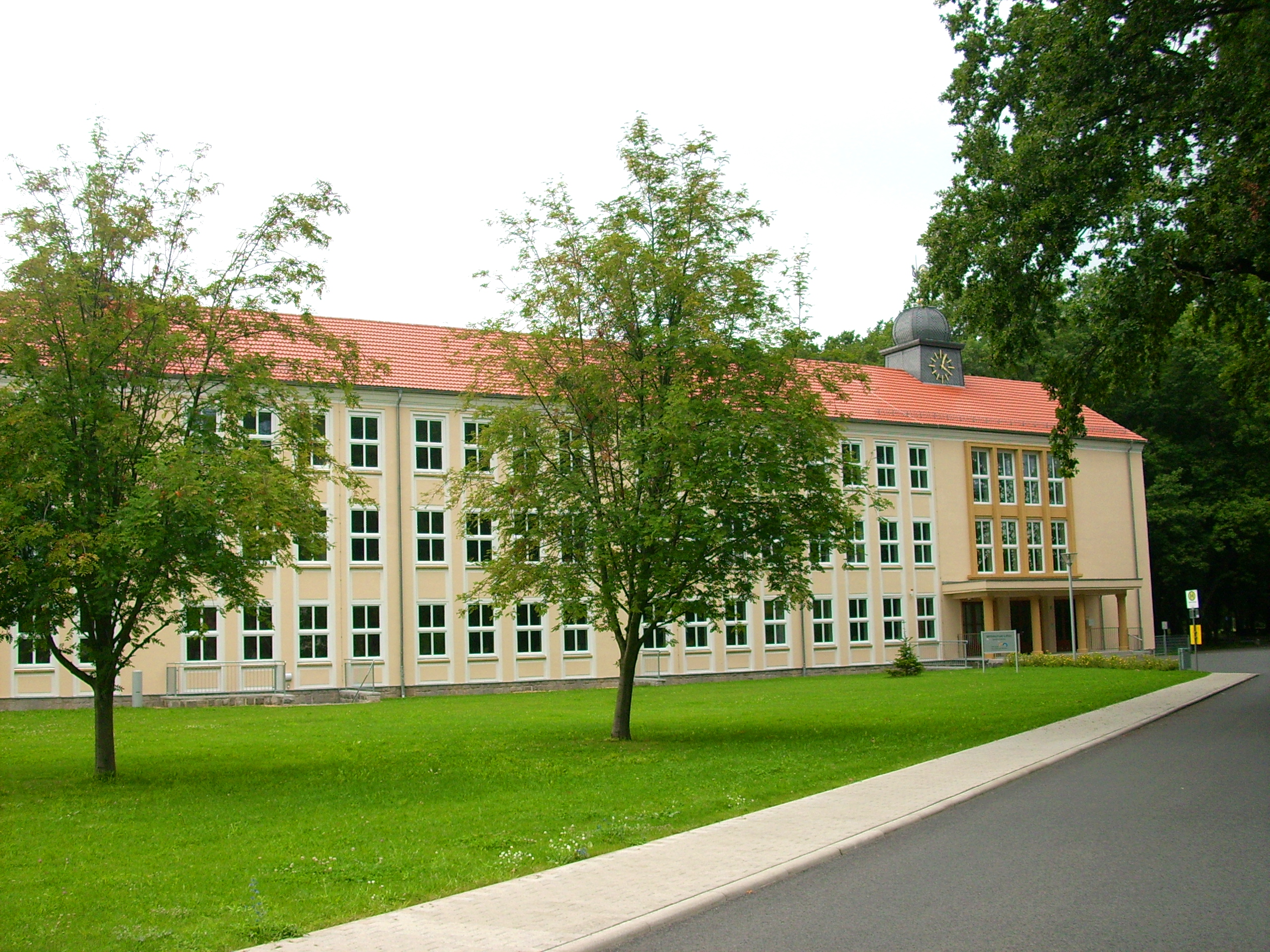
School

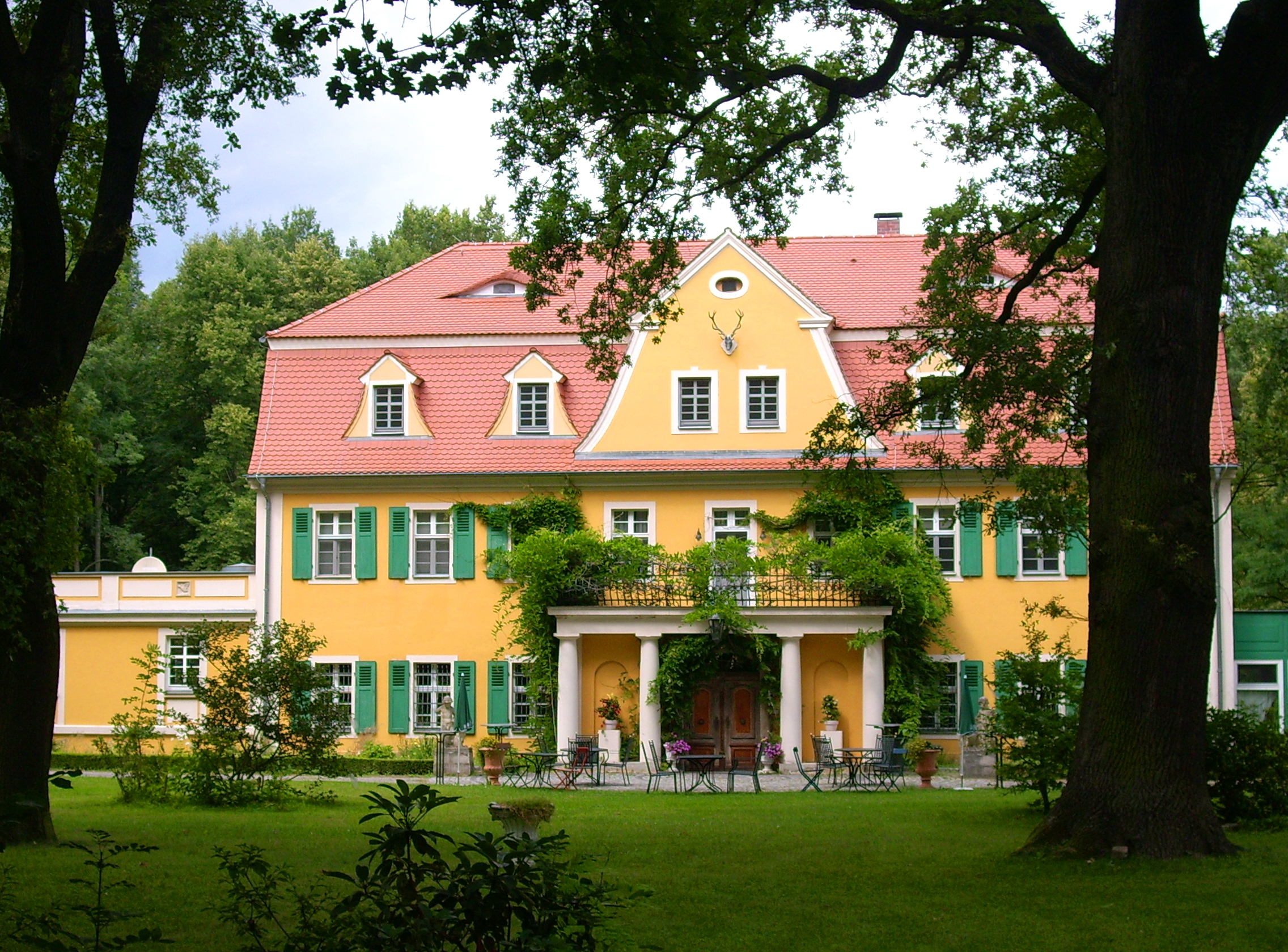
Castle in Weißig/Wysoka

== See also ==
- Speicherbecken Lohsa
