= Saidenbach Dam =

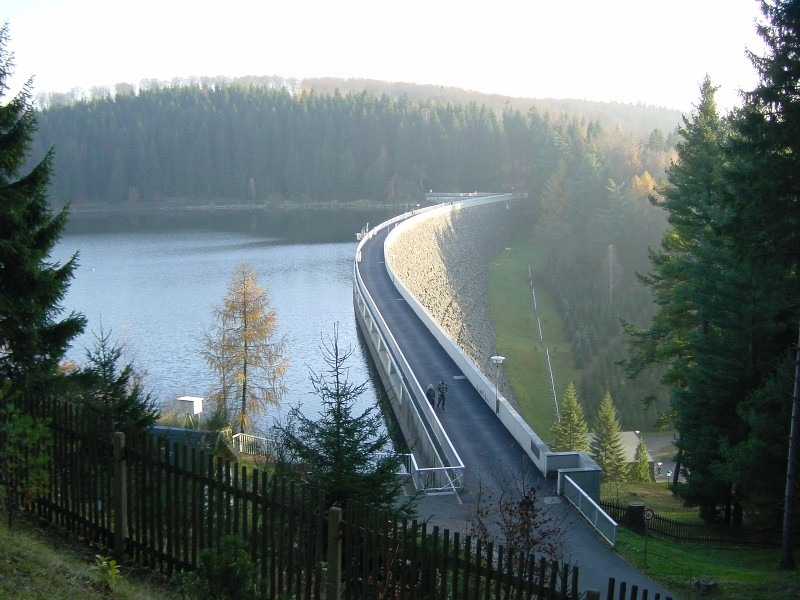
- The Saidenbach Dam

- Location within Germany
- Location: Erzgebirgskreis
- Coordinates: 50.73583°N 13.23417°E
- Construction began: 1929–1933

Dam and spillways
- Impounds: Haselbach, Saidenbach, Lippersdorfer Bach, Hölzelbergbach
- Height (foundation): 58.5 m (192 ft)
- Height (thalweg): 48 m (157 ft)
- Length: 334 m (1,096 ft)
- Elevation at crest: 440.3 m (1,445 ft)
- Width (crest): 4 m (13 ft)
- Dam volume: 203×10^{3} m^{3} (7.2×10^{6} cu ft)

Reservoir
- Total capacity: 22.95×10^{9} m^{3} (18,610,000 acre⋅ft)
- Active capacity: 22.38×10^{9} m^{3} (18,140,000 acre⋅ft)
- Catchment area: 60.8 km^{2} (23.5 sq mi)
- Surface area: 142 ha (350 acres) or 146 ha (360 acres)
- Normal elevation: 438.8 km2

The Saidenbach Dam (German: Talsperre Saidenbach) is a dam in the German state of Saxony. Its reservoir supplies drinking water to Chemnitz and, in conjunction with the Central Ore Mountain Dam System (Talsperrensystem Mittleres Erzgebirge) and its other dams - Neunzehnhain I und II and Einsiedel - contributes to the supply of the region covered by the South Saxony Long Distance Water Association (Zweckverbandes Fernwasser Südsachsen).

To a lesser extent the dam is also used to generate electricity and for flood protection.

The actual dam is a curved gravity dam made of rubble stone and based on the Intze Principle. The dam was built from 1929 to 1933 in the vicinity of Lengefeld in the Ore Mountains and was taken into service in 1933. It is a "large dam" according to ICOLD criteria. The streams impounded are the Haselbach, Saidenbach, Lippersdorfer Bach and Hölzelbergbach.

A public footpath runs along the dam crest. Bathing and leisure sports in the reservoir are not permitted, but the public may walk around the reservoir and it is also available for fishing.

The Saidenbach Dam also has a pre-dam (Forchheim) and ten upper basins, of which four are usually filled.

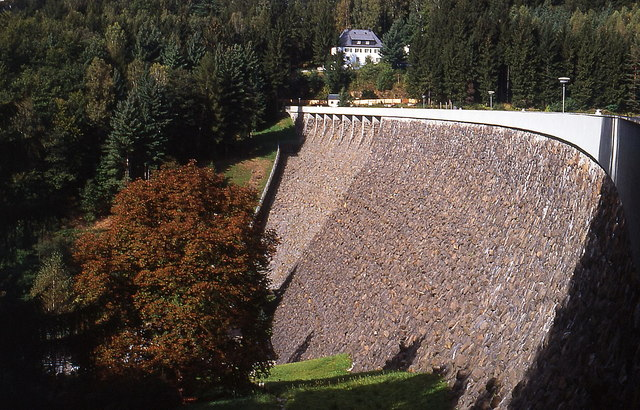
The dam wall

== See also ==
- List of reservoirs and dams in Germany
