= Steinbachtal Dam =

Steinbachtalsperre
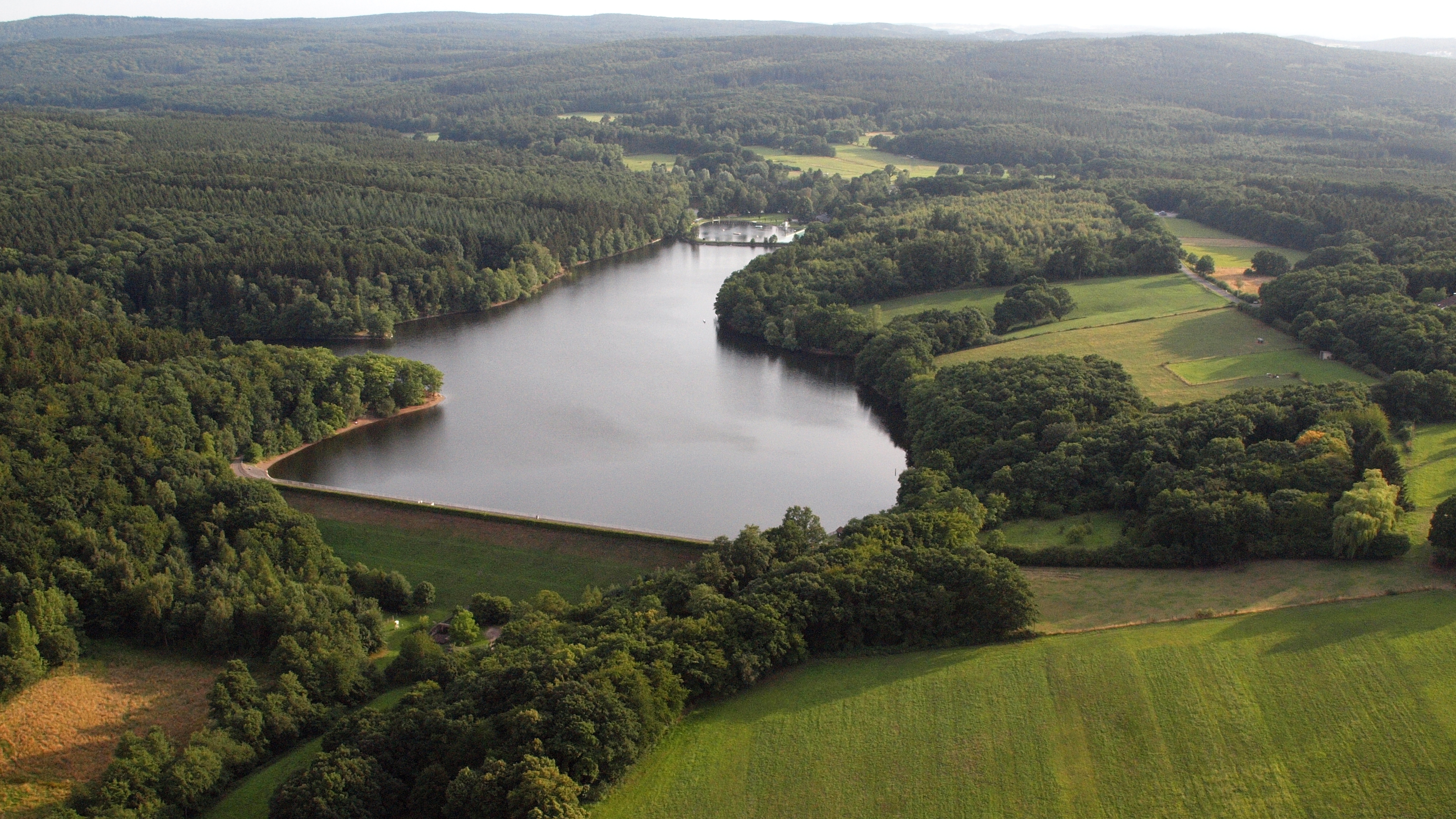
- An aerial photo of the dam, 2015

- Location within North Rhine-Westphalia
- Country: Germany
- Location: Euskirchen, North Rhine-Westphalia
- Coordinates: 50.590833°N 6.836667°E
- Status: In use
- Construction began: 1934

Dam and spillways
- Height (foundation): 23m
- Length: 240 m (790 ft)
- Width (crest): ≈ 5m
- Dam volume: 100,000 m3

Reservoir
- Total capacity: 1.2 million metres^{3}
- Active capacity: 1.06 million metres^{3}
- Catchment area: 16 km^{2}
- Surface area: 14.6 hectares (36 acres)
- Maximum length: 980m
- Maximum width: 380m
- Normal elevation: 278.73 m

The Steinbachtal Dam (German: Steinbachtalsperre) is a dam in the city of Euskirchen, North Rhine-Westphalia south of Euskirchen-Kirchheim.

== History ==
The dam was built due to pressure from the Euskirchen cloth industry, who by the late 1920s was no longer able to meet its water needs from the natural streams in the area. Problems included the water quality, which was heavily polluted by waste from the Mechernich lead mining industry. Additionally, the amount of water available was no longer sufficient to drive the turbines for hydroelectric power. The Steinbach Reservoir Association (German: Zweckverband Steinbachtalsperre) was founded in 1933 to carry out the construction and ongoing operation of the dam. Construction work began in February 1934 and finished in 1936. A 16 km cast-iron pipeline, was built to transport the water to the town of Euskirchen and Kuchenheim.

The lake, which has a maximum depth of 17.4m, is now a popular local recreation area. The dam structure of the reservoir was made of coarse-stone with a clay seal on the water side. It is operated by the Zweckverband Steinbachtalsperre/Wasserversorgungsverband Euskirchen-Swisttal.

From September 1988 to 1990, the dam was redeveloped. Recommissioning began on 27 April 1990. The water side was equipped with a 0.80 m thick concrete layer and two asphalt layers.

=== 2021 flood ===
During the continuous rain in mid-July 2021 the spillways capacity was to small and the earthen dam over-topped for around three hours. Large parts of the air side washed away and the dam was in danger of bursting due to the heavy load. Therefore, about 15,000 residents of the villages Schweinheim, Flamersheim, Palmersheim several villages in Swisttal and the Rheinbach districts Niederdrees and Oberdrees located below had to be evacuated. Potential evacuations were announced for other regions along the Erft, especially Erftstadt and Kerpen. The stones washed away from the dam settled below the bottom outlet and blocked it.

The situation calmed down after the blockage was able to be resolved and a controlled outflow was made possible; additionally several units of the fire brigade and the Federal Agency for Technical Relief (THW) pumped out water.

Evacuation was lifted after five days when the reservoir was nearly empty.

== See also ==
- List of dams and reservoirs in Germany

== Bibliography ==
- Andreas Dix: Industrialisierung und Wassernutzung. Eine historisch-geographische Umweltgeschichte der Tuchfabrik Ludwig Müller in Kuchenheim (= Beiträge zur Industrie- und Sozialgeschichte. Bd. 7). Rheinland-Verlag GmbH, Köln 1997, ISBN 3-7927-1600-3 (Zugleich: Bonn, Univ., Diss., 1993).
- Gundula Lang (2008), "Das Nützliche mit dem Schönen verbinden: Das Waldschwimmbad an der Steinbachtalsperre bei Euskirchen-Kirchheim" (PDF), Denkmalpflege Im Rheinland (in German), vol. 25, no. 3, pp. 134–140, ISSN 0177-2619, Format: PDF, KBytes: 871

== Gallery ==
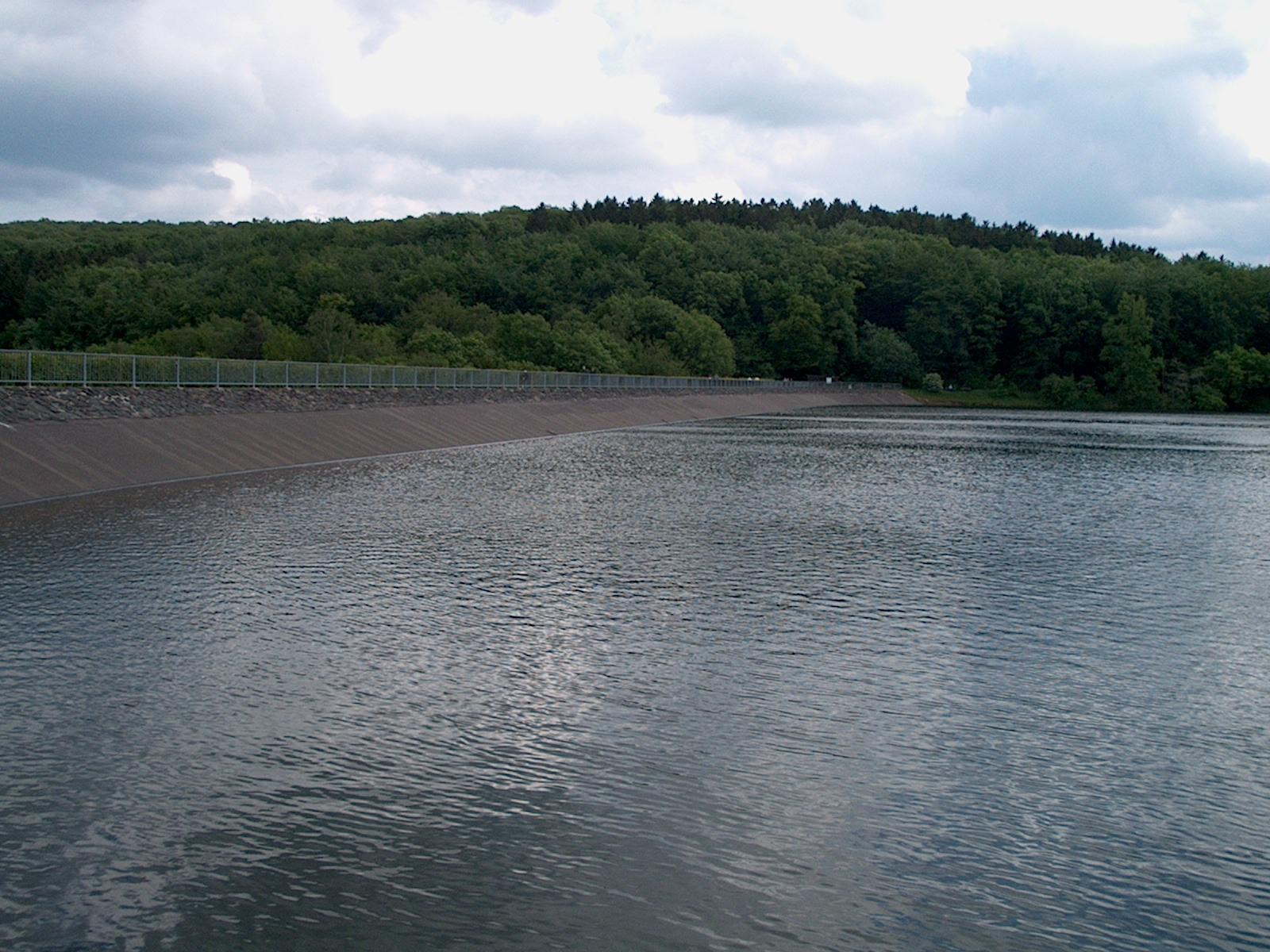
View of the dam in northeastern direction.

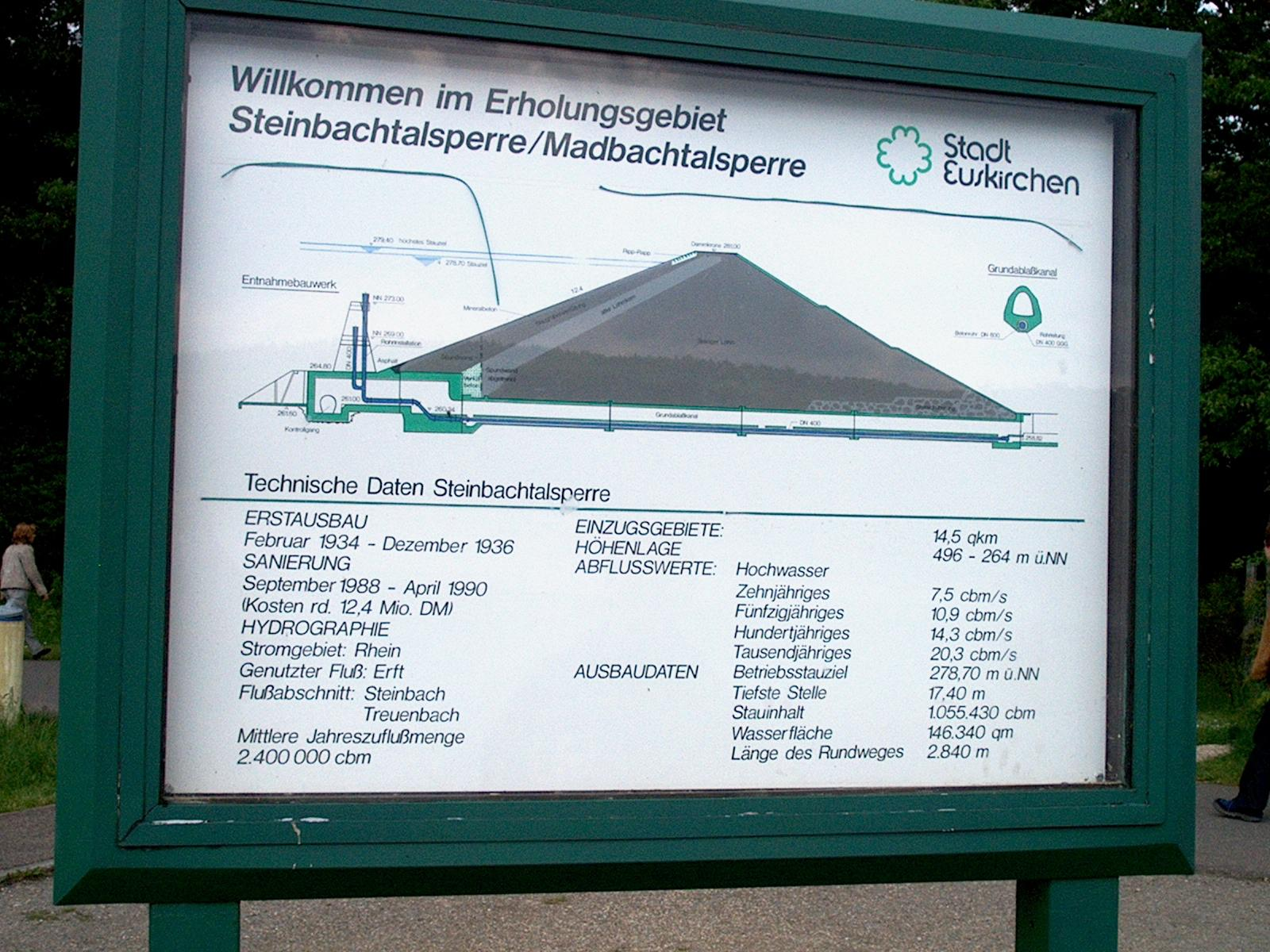
Information board at the dam

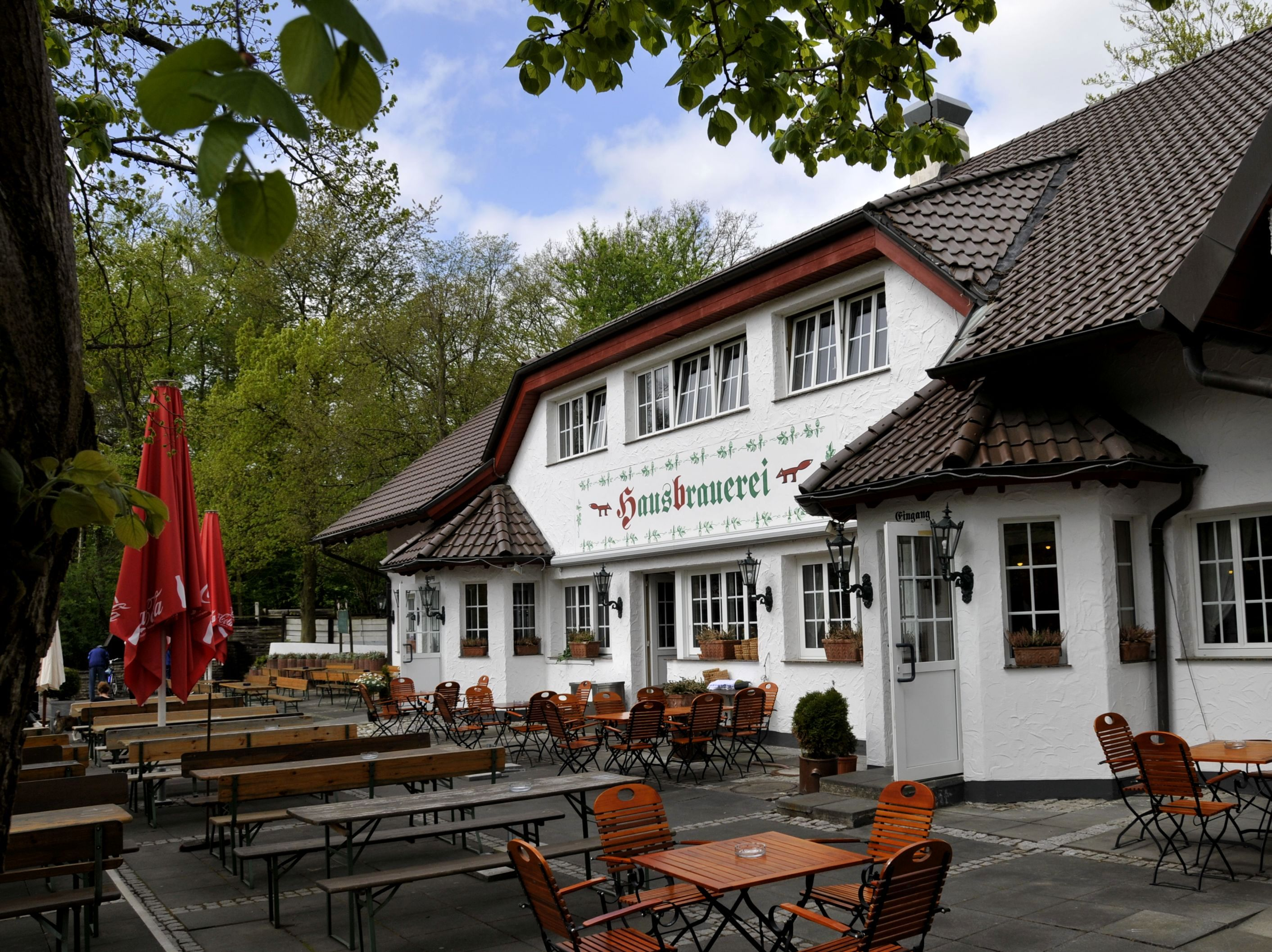
Forest restaurant at the dam

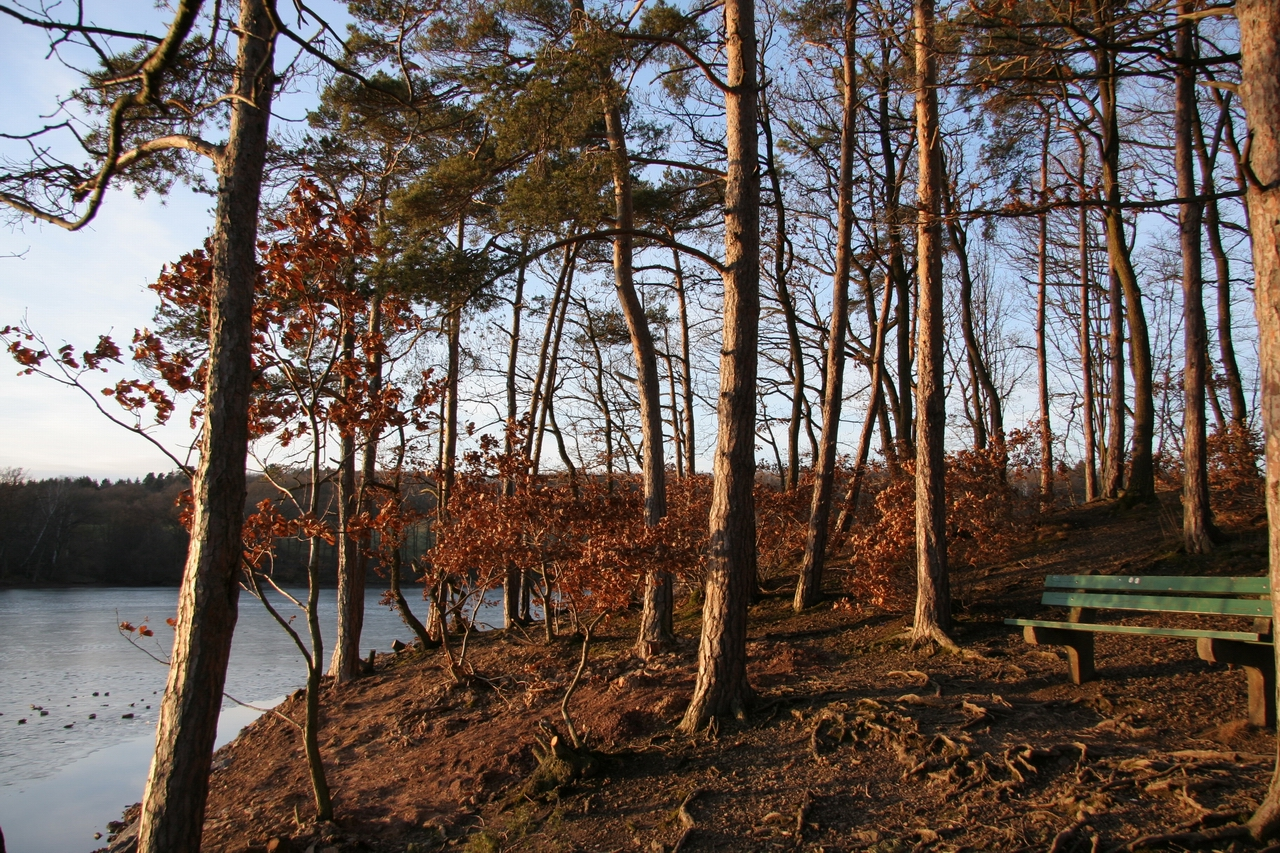
Evening atmosphere at the Steinbach dam

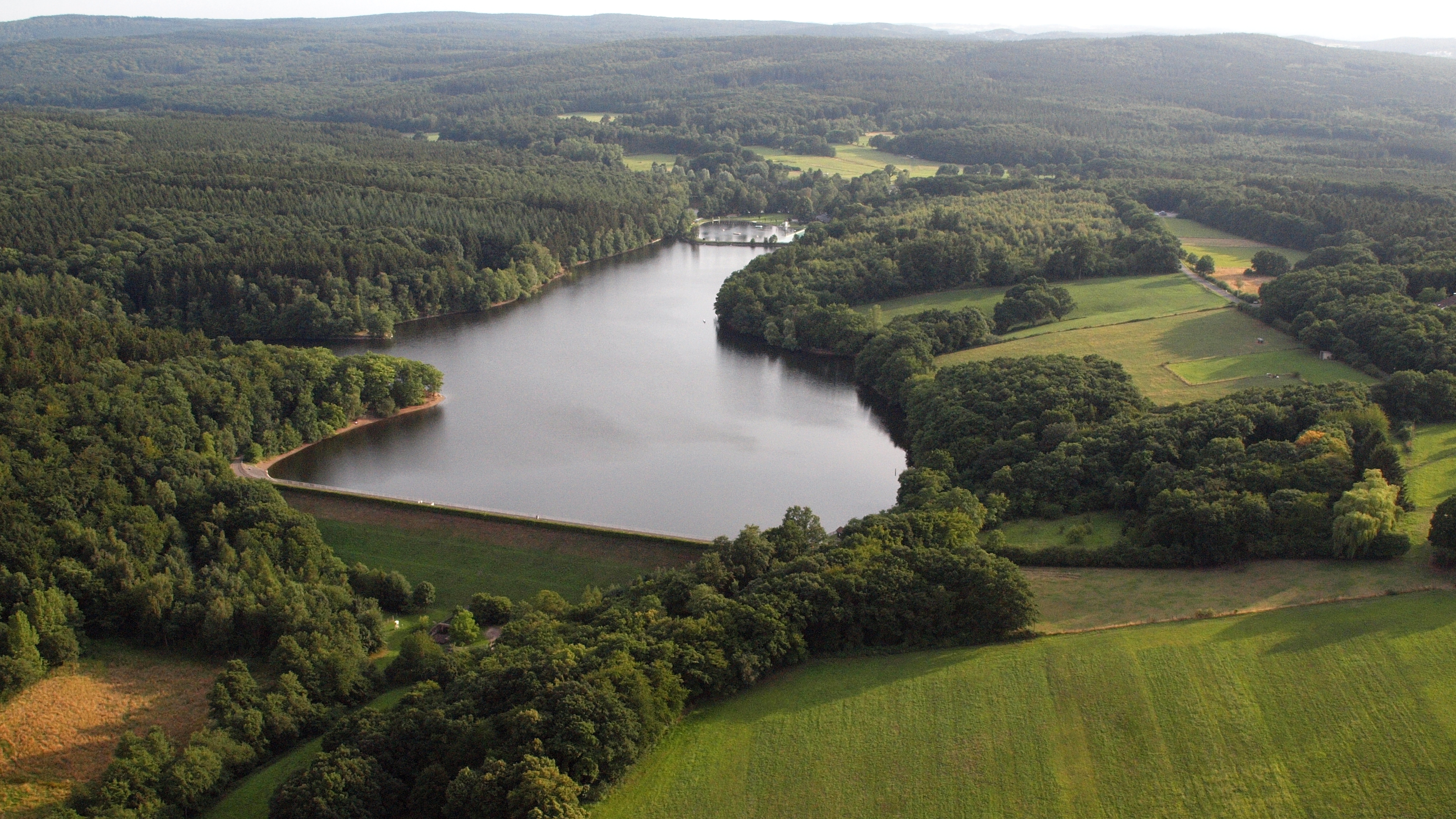
Aerial view, 2015

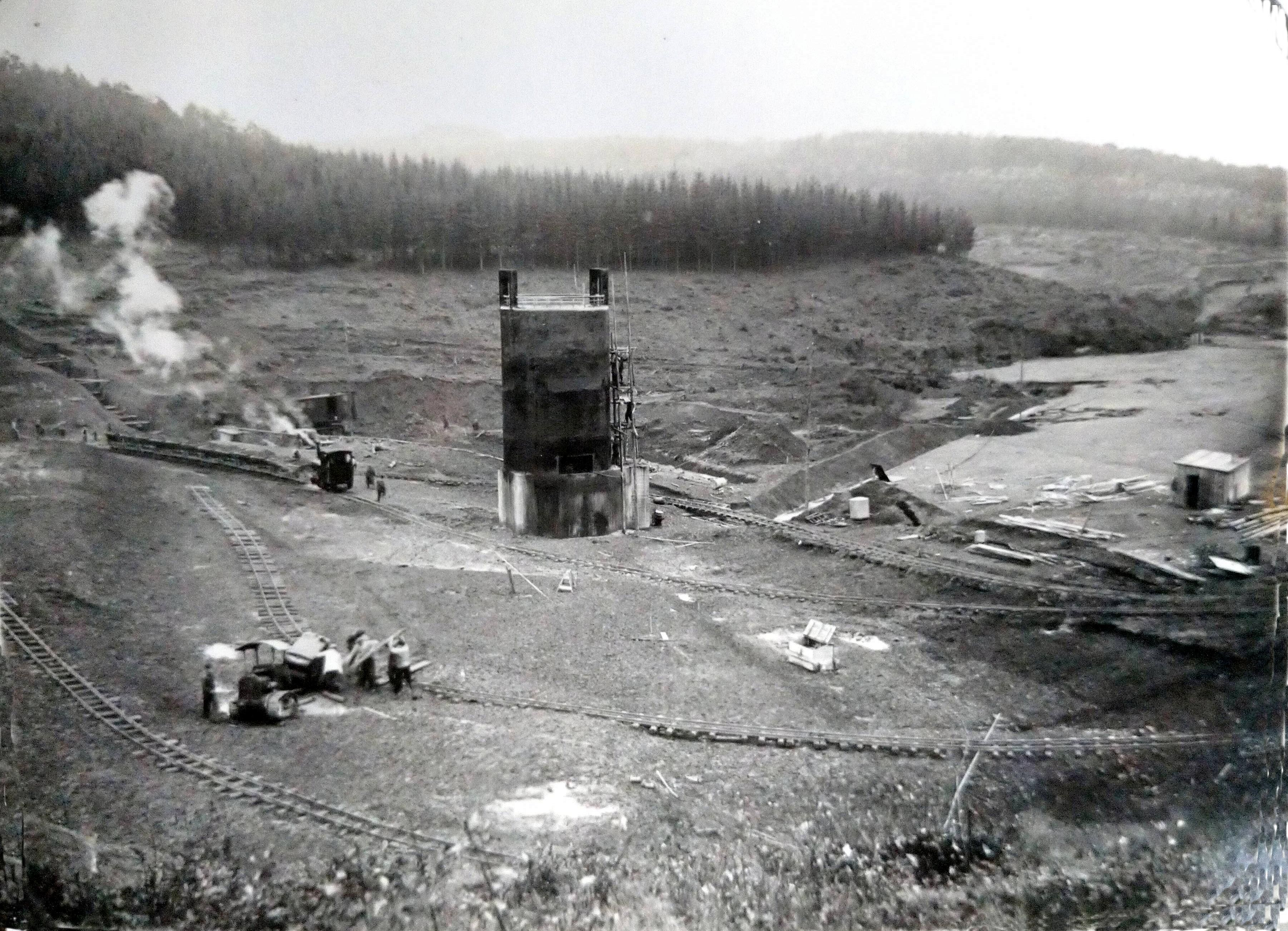
Construction of the dam 1934/35
