= Eschbach Dam =

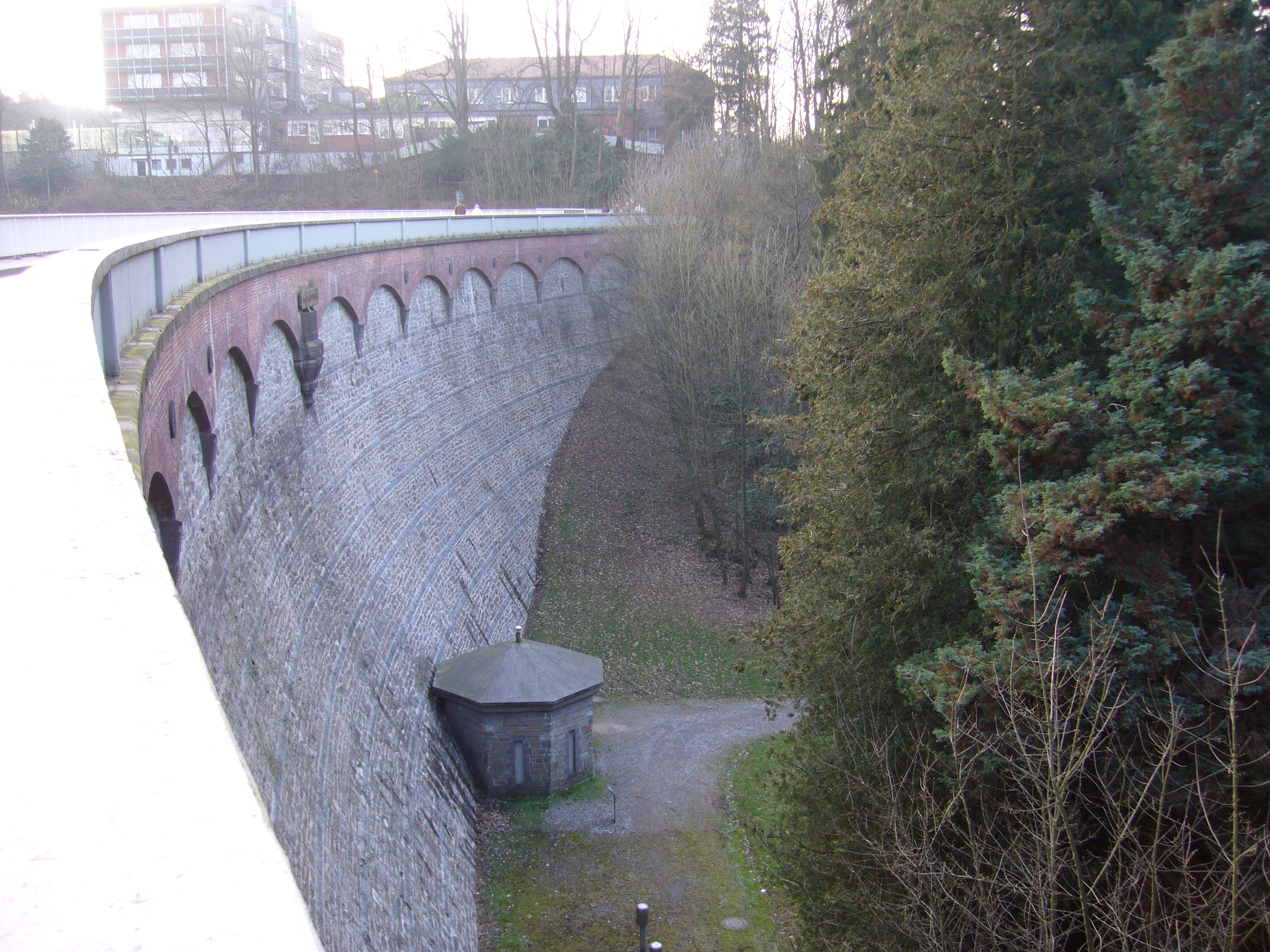
- The dam in December 2006.

- Location within Germany
- Official name: Eschbachtalsperre
- Country: Germany
- Location: Remscheid, North Rhine-Westphalia
- Coordinates: 51°09′38″N 07°14′02″E
- Construction began: 1889
- Opening date: 1891

Dam and spillways
- Height: 25 m (82 ft)
- Length: 160 m (525 ft)
- Width (crest): 5.01 m (16 ft)
- Dam volume: 17,000 m^{3} (600,000 ft^{3})
- Spillway capacity: 11 m^{3}/s (388 cu ft/s)

Reservoir
- Total capacity: 1.120 MCM
- Catchment area: 5.25 km^{2} (2.0 mi^{2})
- Surface area: 140,000 m^{2} (1,500,000 ft^{2})

The Eschbach Dam (German: Eschbachtalsperre) was the first dam to be built in Germany for drinking water supply. It is located in Remscheid, North Rhine-Westphalia, Germany. With its opening in 1891, this pioneer work of hydraulic engineering was a milestone in the economic development of the city of Remscheid.

== History ==
The Eschbach Dam was designed by pioneering hydraulic engineer and professor Otto Intze. It was constructed during the years 1889 to 1891 by the industrialist Robert Böker following the idea of the Intze Principle.

Until the beginning of the 20th century it was common in Germany to name the dam after the city where it stood rather than the waters it impounded. Consequently, in the writings of the times, the Eschbach Dam is also called the Remscheid Dam.

This impressive work of water commerce saw many diverse imitations worldwide and was a popular tourist destination from the beginning. Prince Friedrich Leopold of Prussia visited the dam on 15 July 1897. Two years later, Emperor Wilhelm II visited the dam and praised it as a great work of construction technology and water commerce. In 1977, in order to make the dam more attractive to visitors, a road was built around the reservoir that led to a nature trail.

The dam was redeveloped from 1991 to 1994. It was refortified with a 35 cm (13 in) thick concrete retaining wall and an inspection walkway on the water side. A new drainage system was also added, along with new removal processors and monitoring systems.

A good view of the remodeled retaining wall and the water of the reservoir encircled by trees can be seen from the terrace of the A 1's Remscheid motorway services.

== Dam network ==
The dam belongs to the water association of the Wupper Association. It is connected to the Neye Dam and is fed through there as needed.

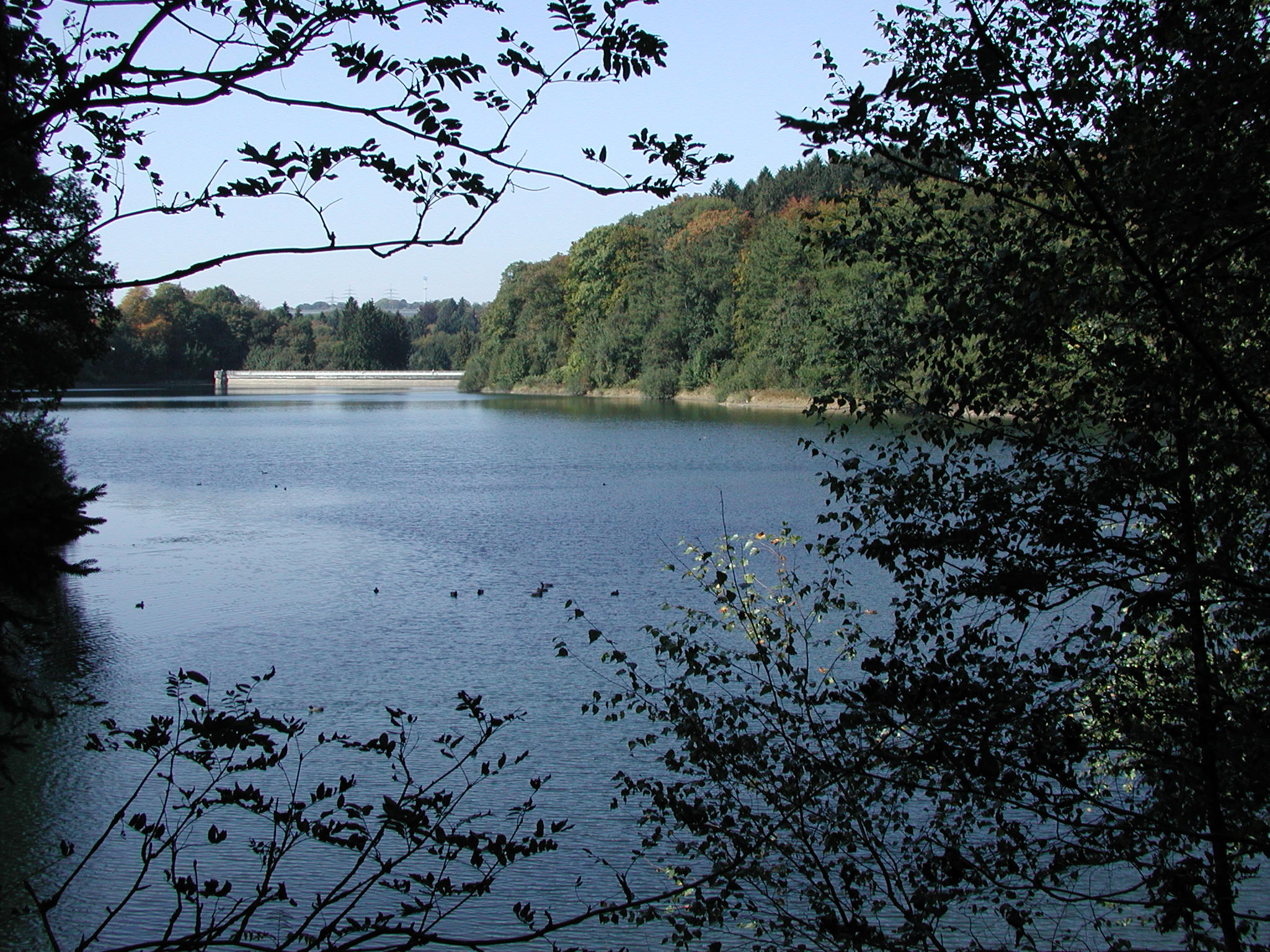
The Eschbach Dam.

== See also ==
- List of reservoirs and dams
- Reservoirs and dams in Germany
