= Lohsa station =

Train station in Saxony

Lohsa Łaz

General information
- Location: Am Silbersee; 02999 Lohsa; Saxony; Germany
- Coordinates: 51.38°N 14.40°E
- Owner: Deutsche Bahn
- Operator: DB Station&Service
- Lines: Węgliniec–Roßlau railway (KBS 229)
- Platforms: 2 side platform
- Tracks: 2
- Train operators: ODEG
- Connections: RB 64

Construction
- Parking: yes
- Cycle facilities: no
- Accessible: yes

Other information
- Station code: 3773
- DS100 code: BLOH
- IBNR: 8070835
- Category: 7
- Fare zone: ZVON
- Website: www.bahnhof.de

Services
Preceding station	Ostdeutsche Eisenbahn	Following station
Hoyerswerda-Neustadt towards Hoyerswerda	RB 64	Uhyst towards Görlitz
Location
- Location within Saxony Location within Germany Location within Europe

Lohsa/Łaz station (German: Haltepunkt Lohsa; Upper Sorbian: Dwórnišćo Łaz) is a railway station in the municipality of Lohsa, located in the Bautzen district in Saxony, Germany.

Since 2025, the station has had an observation point with a telescope, so that visitors to the Lusatian Lake District can look at the Silbersee (lake) and local wildlife.
