= Hoyerswerda-Neustadt station =

Railway station in Saxony, Germany

Hoyerswerda-Neustadt Wojerecy Nowe Město
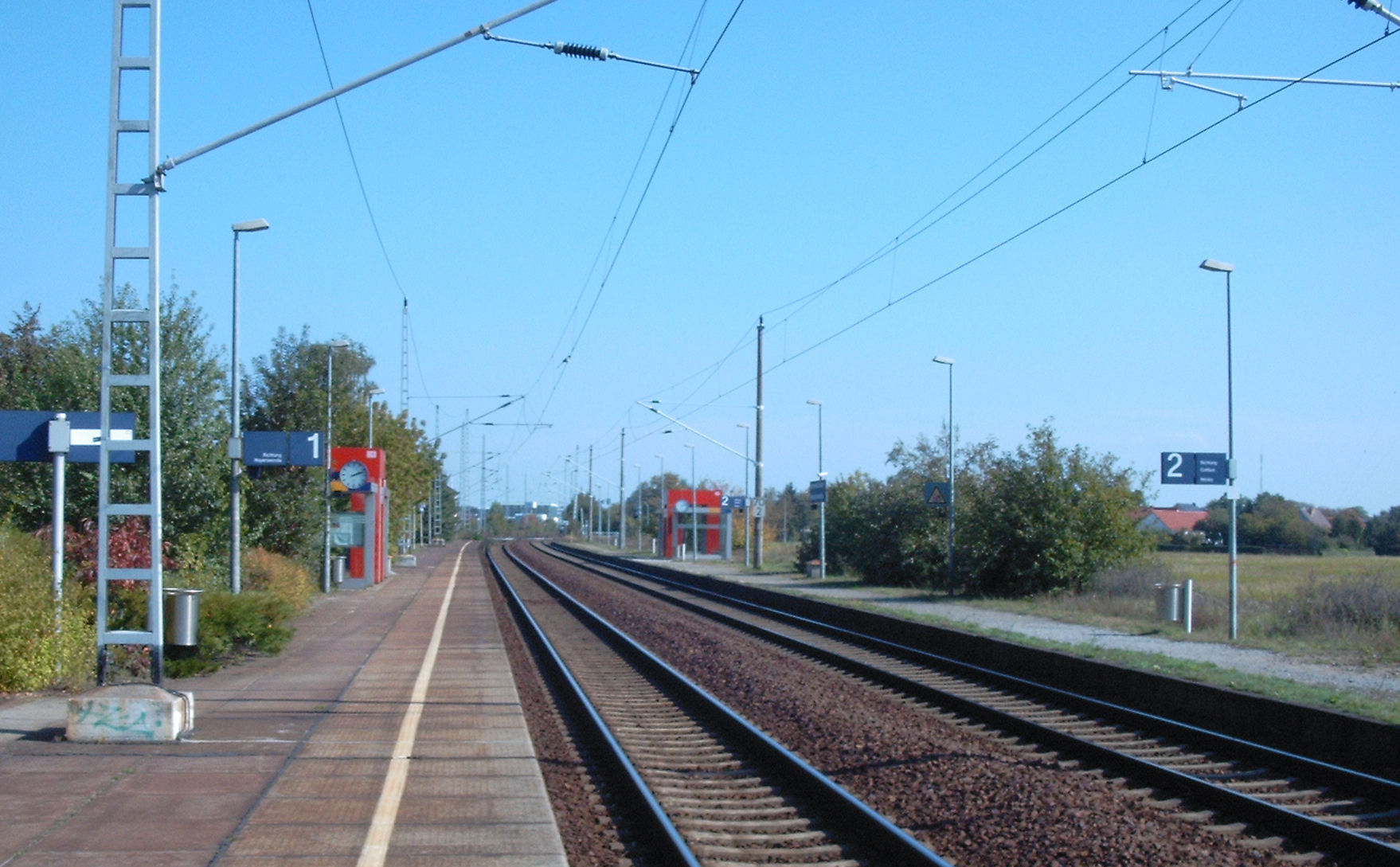
- 2007

General information
- Location: Südstraße; 02977 Hoyerswerda, Saxony; Germany
- Coordinates: 51°25′44″N 14°16′03″E
- Owner: Deutsche Bahn
- Operator: DB Station&Service
- Line: Węgliniec–Roßlau railway
- Platforms: 2 side platforms
- Tracks: 2
- Train operators: ODEG

Other information
- Station code: 2932
- DS100 code: BHWN
- IBNR: 8071702
- Category: 7

Services
Preceding station	Ostdeutsche Eisenbahn	Following station
Hoyerswerda Terminus	RB 64	Lohsa towards Görlitz
Location

Hoyerswerda-Neustadt station is a railway station in the Neustadt district in the town of Hoyerswerda, located in the Bautzen district in Saxony, Germany.
