= Kleine Kinzig Dam =

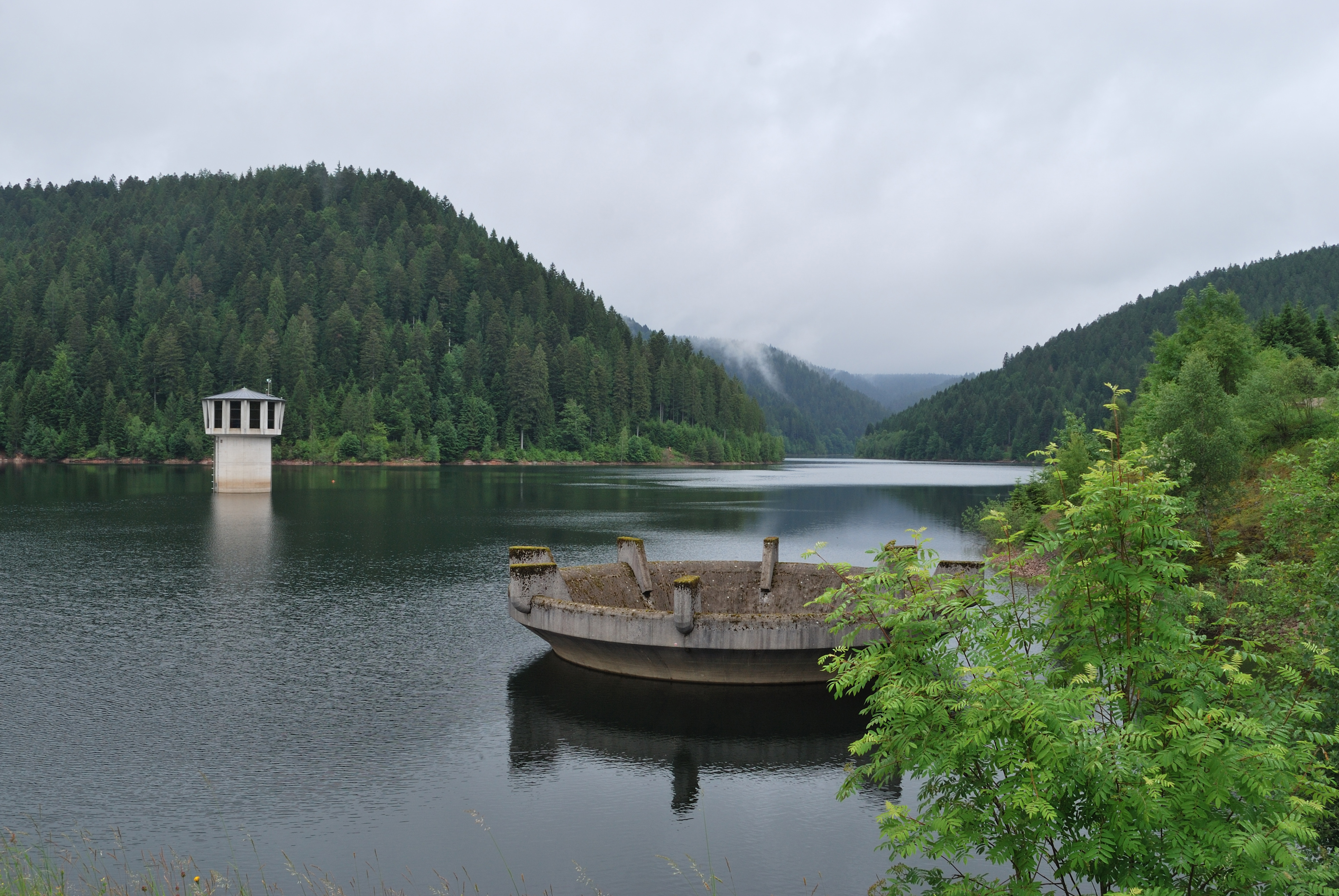
- Interactive map of Kleine Kinzig Dam
- Official name: Talsperre Kleine Kinzig
- Country: Germany
- Location: County of Freudenstadt
- Coordinates: 48.39889°N 08.36556°E
- Purpose: Freshwater dam, flood-control dam
- Construction began: 1978
- Opening date: 1982

Dam and spillways
- Type of dam: Rockfill dam
- Impounds: Kleine Kinzig
- Height (foundation): 71 m (233 ft)
- Height (thalweg): 70 m (230 ft)
- Length: 380 m (1,250 ft)
- Elevation at crest: 609 m (1,998 ft)
- Width (crest): 8 m (26 ft)
- Dam volume: 1,420,000 m³
- Spillway capacity: 113 m³/s

Reservoir
- Total capacity: 14×10^{6} m^{3} (4.9×10^{8} cu ft)
- Active capacity: 13.3×10^{6} m^{3} (4.7×10^{8} cu ft)
- Catchment area: 18.6 km^{2} (7.2 sq mi)
- Surface area: 0.60580 km^{2} (0.23390 sq mi)

The Kleine Kinzig Dam (German: Talsperre Kleine Kinzig or Kleine-Kinzig-Talsperre) is a dam which was commissioned in 1984 in Reinerzau near Freudenstadt in Germany's Black Forest. It lies within the state of Baden-Württemberg and supplies drinking water, provides flood protection, drought protection and power generation using hydropower. It impounds the Kleine Kinzig river; the dam belongs to the Kleine Kinzig Special Purpose Association (Zweckverband Kleine Kinzig)

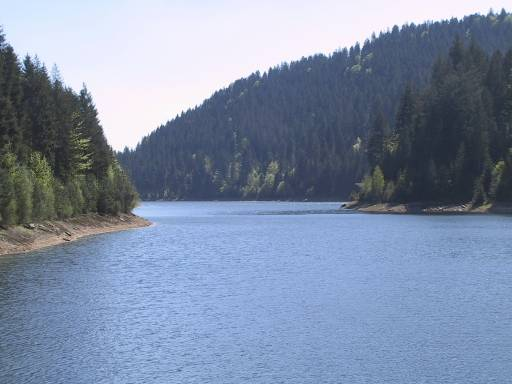
The reservoir seen from the north

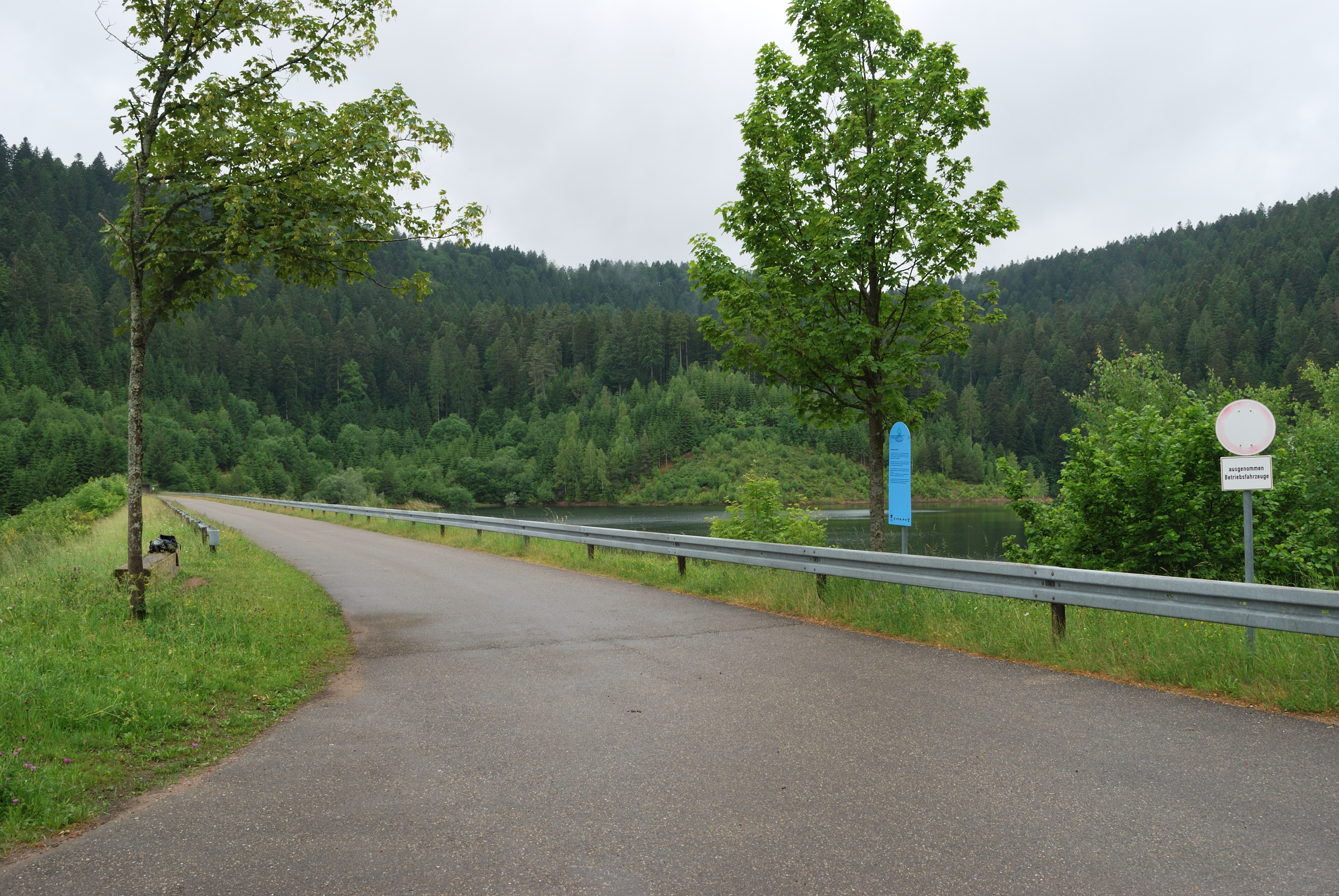
The road across the dam

The barrier is a rockfill dam with asphalt concrete interior sealing (bituminous core). The dam is made of granite and bunter sandstone and was constructed from May 1981 to October 1982. The initial impoundment of the river lasted from 13 December 1982 to June 1984.

Overflow protection is housed in a tower with a circular spillway in the reservoir, to which a gallery is connected. The rated capacity of the power plant is 580 kW. The reservoir supplies between 3 and 8 million m³ of drinking water annually.

The reservoir is ca. 3 km (1.9 mi) long, 450 m (1,480 ft) wide and has a maximum depth of 60 m (200 ft).

There is also a forebay with a 15 m (49 ft)-high dam made of earth and rock from the hillside (Hangschuttmaterial).

The Kleine Kinzig dam should not be confused with the Kinzig Dam near Steinau in Hesse.

== See also ==
- List of dams in Germany

== Literature ==
- Alwin Eppler: Die Talsperre Kleine Kinzig. Trinkwasser für eine Schwarzwald-Region. Eppe, Aulendorf / Bergatreute 2004, ISBN 3-89089-077-6.
- Nationales Komitee für Große Talsperren in der Bundesrepublik Deutschland (DNK) und Deutscher Verband für Wasserwirtschaft und Kulturbau e.V. (DVWK) (Hrsg.), Peter Franke, Wolfgang Frey (Bearb.): Talsperren in der Bundesrepublik Deutschland. Berlin 1987, ISBN 3-926520-00-0.
- Trinkwasser aus dem Schwarzwald. (Prospekt des Zweckverbandes Wasserversorgung Kleine Kinzig)
