= List of dams and reservoirs in Germany =

These are dams and reservoirs in Germany. The German word Talsperre (literally: valley barrier) may mean dam, but it is often used to include the associated reservoir as well. The reservoirs are often separately given names ending in -see, -teich or -speicher which are the German words for "lake", "pond" and "reservoir", but in this case all may also be translated as "reservoir". The more specific word for the actual dam is Staumauer and for the lake is Stausee.

== Baden-Württemberg ==
- Kleine Kinzig Dam
- Nagold Dam
- Schluchsee - highest reservoir lake in Germany and largest lake in the Black Forest
- Schwarzenbach Dam

== Bavaria ==
- Ellertshäuser See
- Großer Brombachsee
- Forggensee
- Frauenau Dam
- Sylvenstein Dam
- Altmühlsee
- Rothsee
- Hahnenkammsee

== Brandenburg ==
- Spremberg Reservoir

== Hesse ==
- Aar Dam
- Affoldern Reservoir
- Antrift Dam
- Diemelsee (reservoir)
- Driedorf Reservoir
- Edersee

== Lower Saxony ==
- Ecker Dam
- Grane Dam
- Innerste Dam
- Oder Dam
- Oderteich
- Oker Dam
- Söse Dam
- Wendebach Dam

== North Rhine-Westphalia ==
- Aabach Dam
- Agger Dam
- Ahauser Reservoir
- Baldeney Reservoir
- Bever Dam
- Beyenburg Reservoir
- Biggesee
- Borchen Flood Control Basin
- Breitenbach Dam
- Bruchbachtal-Büderich Flood Control Basin
- Bruch Dam
- Dahlhausen Dam
- Diepental Dam
- Große Dhünn Dam
- Dreilägerbach Dam
- Ebbinghausen Flood Control Basin
- Eicherscheid Flood Control Basin
- Eiserbach Dam
- Ennepe Dam
- Eringerfeld Flood Control Basin
- Eschbach Dam
- Esmecke Reservoir
- Fuelbecke Dam
- Fürwigge Dam
- Genkel Dam
- Glingebach Dam
- Glör Dam
- Gollentaler Grund Flood Control Basin
- Hengsteysee
- Kall Dam
- Kemnader See
- Möhne Reservoir
- Olef Dam
- Perlenbach Dam
- Rur Dam
- Sorpe Reservoir
- Steinbachtal Dam
- Urft Dam
- Wahnbach Dam
- Wehebach Dam
- Wupper Dam

== Saxony ==
- Altenberg Reservoir
- Bautzen Reservoir
- Borna Reservoir
- Buschbach Flood Control Basin
- Carlsfeld Dam
- Cranzahl Dam
- Dörnthaler Teich
- Dröda Dam
- Eibenstock Dam
- Einsiedel Dam
- Euba Dam
- Falkenstein Dam
- Forchheim Auxiliary Dam
- Friedrichswalde-Ottendorf Flood Control Basin
- Gottleuba Dam
- Quitzdorf Dam
- Sosa Dam
- Saidenbach Dam
- Wallroda Dam

== Saxony-Anhalt ==
- Ecker Dam
- Kelbra Dam
- Kiliansteich Dam
- Königshütte Dam
- Mandelholz Dam
- Rappbode Dam, highest dam in Germany.
- Rappbode Auxiliary Dam
- Wendefurth Dam
- Wippra Dam
- Zillierbach Dam

== Thuringia ==
In Thuringia there are 171 reservoirs. The biggest of them are:

- Bleiloch Dam (biggest reservoir in Germany, volume: ~215 million m^{3}), river Saale
- Deesbach Forebay (height 42.5 m; volume ~3.2 million m^{3}), river Lichte
- Haselbach Reservoir (~25 million m^{3}), flooded opencast mining area
- Hohenwarte Reservoir (volume: ~182 million m^{3}), river Saale
- Leibis-Lichte Dam (height 102.5 m; volume ~32,4 million m^{3}), river Lichte
- Neustadt Dam - Thuringia's oldest dam
- Schmalwasser Dam (~21,2 million m^{3}), river Schmalwasser
- Schönbrunn Dam (~23,2 million m^{3}), river Schleuse
- Zeulenroda Dam (~30,4 million m^{3}), river Weida

== See also ==
- List of dams in the Harz
