= Wallroda Dam =

Dam in Germany

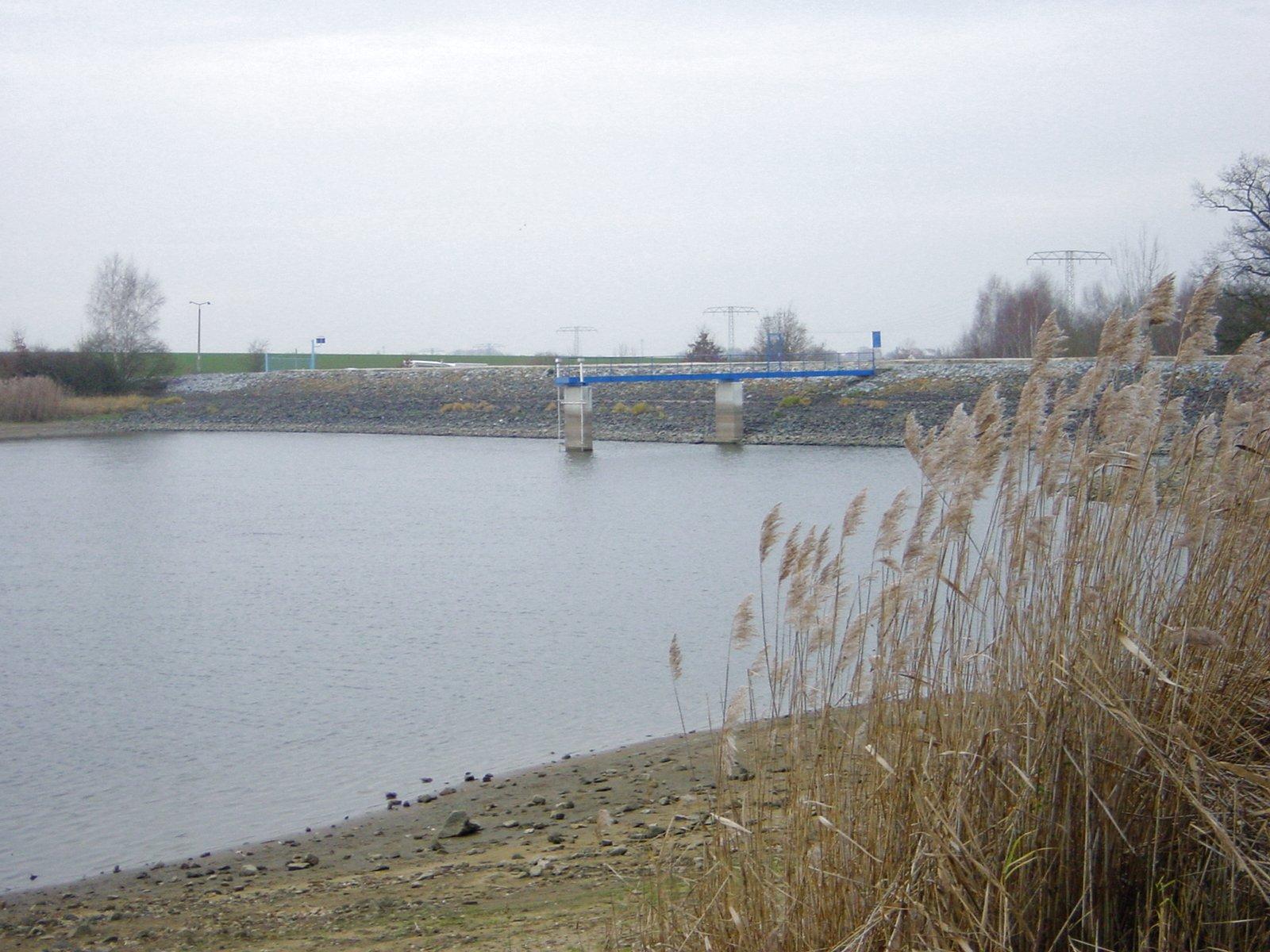

- Location within Saxony
- Official name: Talsperre Wallroda
- Country: Germany
- Location: Bautzen, Saxony
- Coordinates: 51°7′4″N 13°58′35″E
- Construction began: 1986
- Opening date: 1989

Dam and spillways
- Height (foundation): 11.6 metres (38 ft)
- Height (thalweg): 10.1 metres (33 ft)
- Length: 200 metres (660 ft)
- Elevation at crest: 260.89 metres (855.9 ft)
- Width (crest): 3 metres (9.8 ft)
- Dam volume: 22,000 cubic metres (780,000 ft^{3})

Reservoir
- Total capacity: 840,000 cubic metres (30,000,000 ft^{3})
- Surface area: 36 hectares (89 acres)
- Normal elevation: 259.7 metres (852 ft)

Wallroda Dam (German: Talsperre Wallroda) is a dam near Radeberg, Germany.

== Construction ==
The dam was built between 1986 and 1989 in Wallroda near Radeberg and south of Großröhrsdorf, with the intended purpose of supplying water to farms and fisheries in the area. It also has a small part in regional flood prevention strategies.

== Recreational activities ==
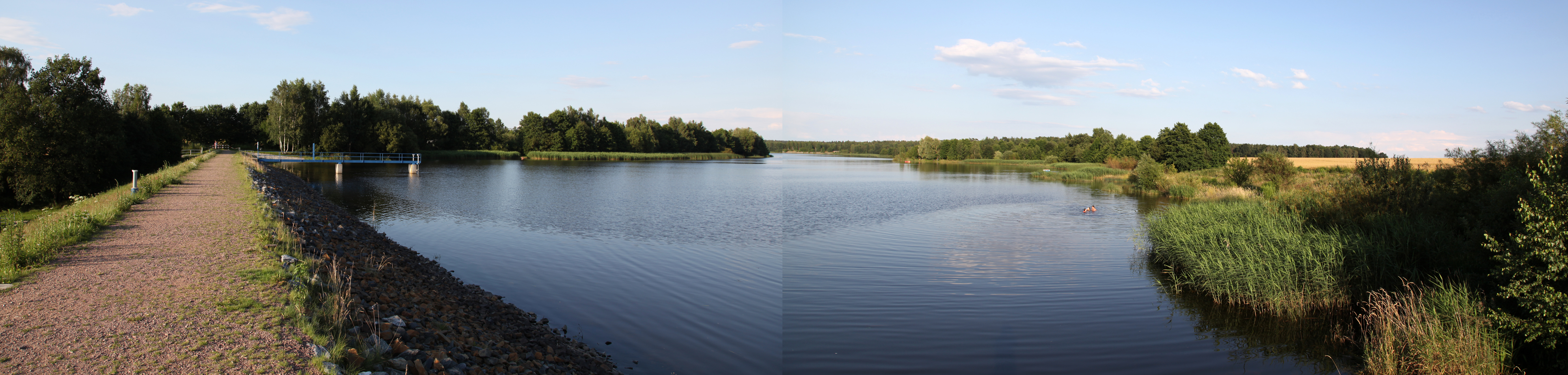
Panoramic view of the reservoir

=== Camping ===
A campsite can be found on the northern bank of the dam. Additionally, there are a restaurant and a miniature golf course.

=== Swimming ===
There are no water rescue facilities, anyone who enters the water does so at their own risk.

=== Fishing ===
The dam's reservoir is listed with the Deutscher Anglerverband (German Angling Association). For environmental protection reasons, fishing is only permitted in designated areas.

== See also ==
- List of dams and reservoirs in Germany
