= Borna Reservoir =

Coordinates: 51°06′37″N 12°27′00″E

Speicherbecken Borna
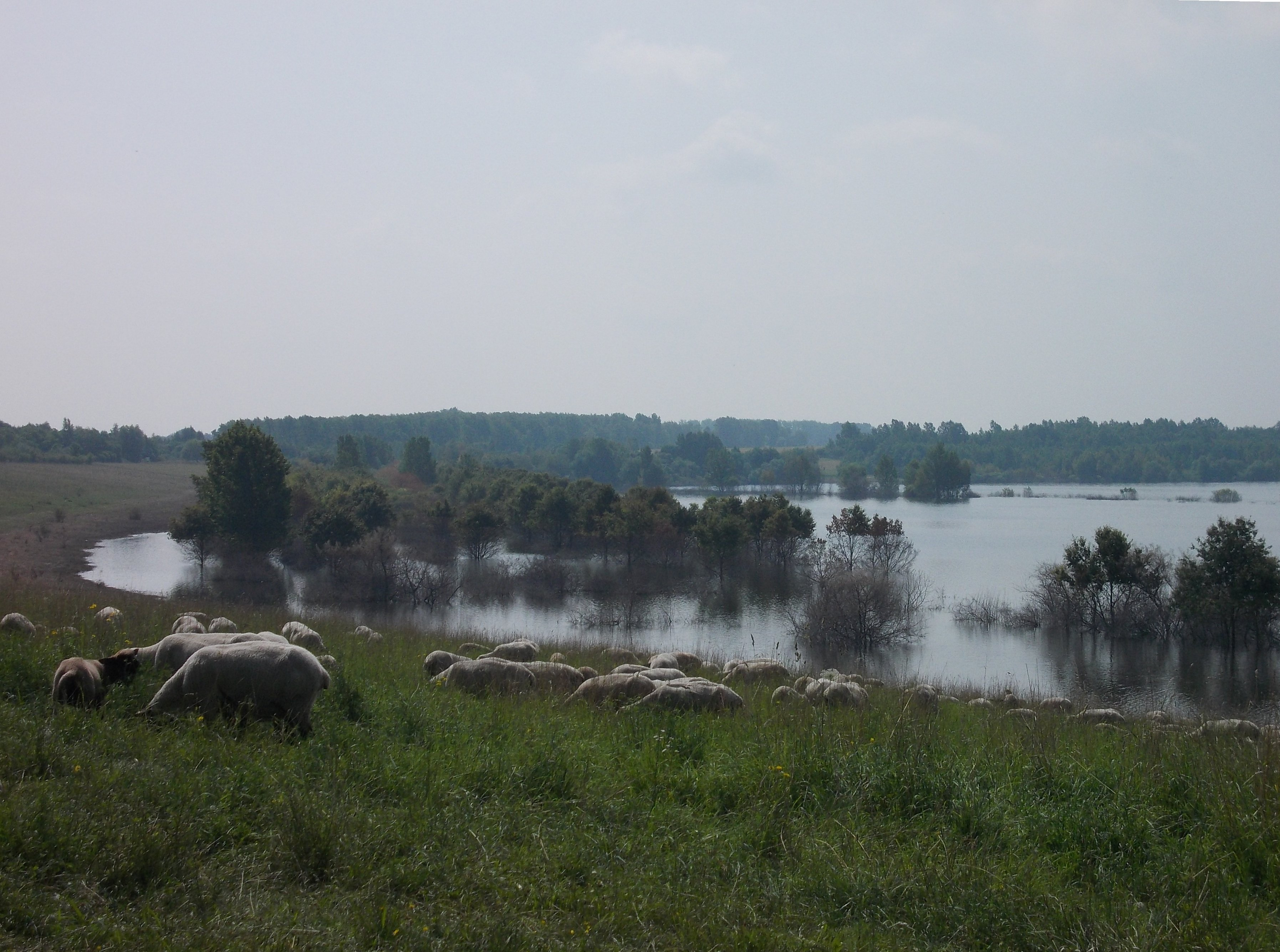
- The lake in 2013
- Interactive map of Speicherbecken Borna
- Location: Landkreis Leipzig, Sachsen, Deutschland
- Construction began: 1964–1980

Dam and spillways
- Impounds: Pleiße
- Height (foundation): 17.9
- Height (thalweg): 14
- Length: 6500
- Elevation at crest: 152
- Width (crest): 30

Reservoir
- Total capacity: 99,80 Mio. m³
- Active capacity: 97,10 Mio. m³
- Catchment area: 769
- Surface area: 5.72
- Normal elevation: 150

The Borna Reservoir (German: Speicherbecken Borna) is a balancing lake near Borna, Leipzig, in Germany. After the Borna-West surface mine was shut down in 1970, the site underwent construction in the following years (64-80) and was taken into service starting in 1977.

The lake is usually only half-full, with the capacity of storing an additional 46,1 million cube meters of water. The maximum depth is 25 m and can be up to 38 m if the lake is full.

The lake is served by the Pleiße and is today used for recreational purposes and fishing. It is a certified bathing lake of the state of Saxony as well as the EU. Locals colloquially call it "Adria".

== History ==
Villages that had to be resettled when the mine was originally include Blumroda, Hartmannsdorf, Görnitz and Alt-Deutzen.

== Gallery ==
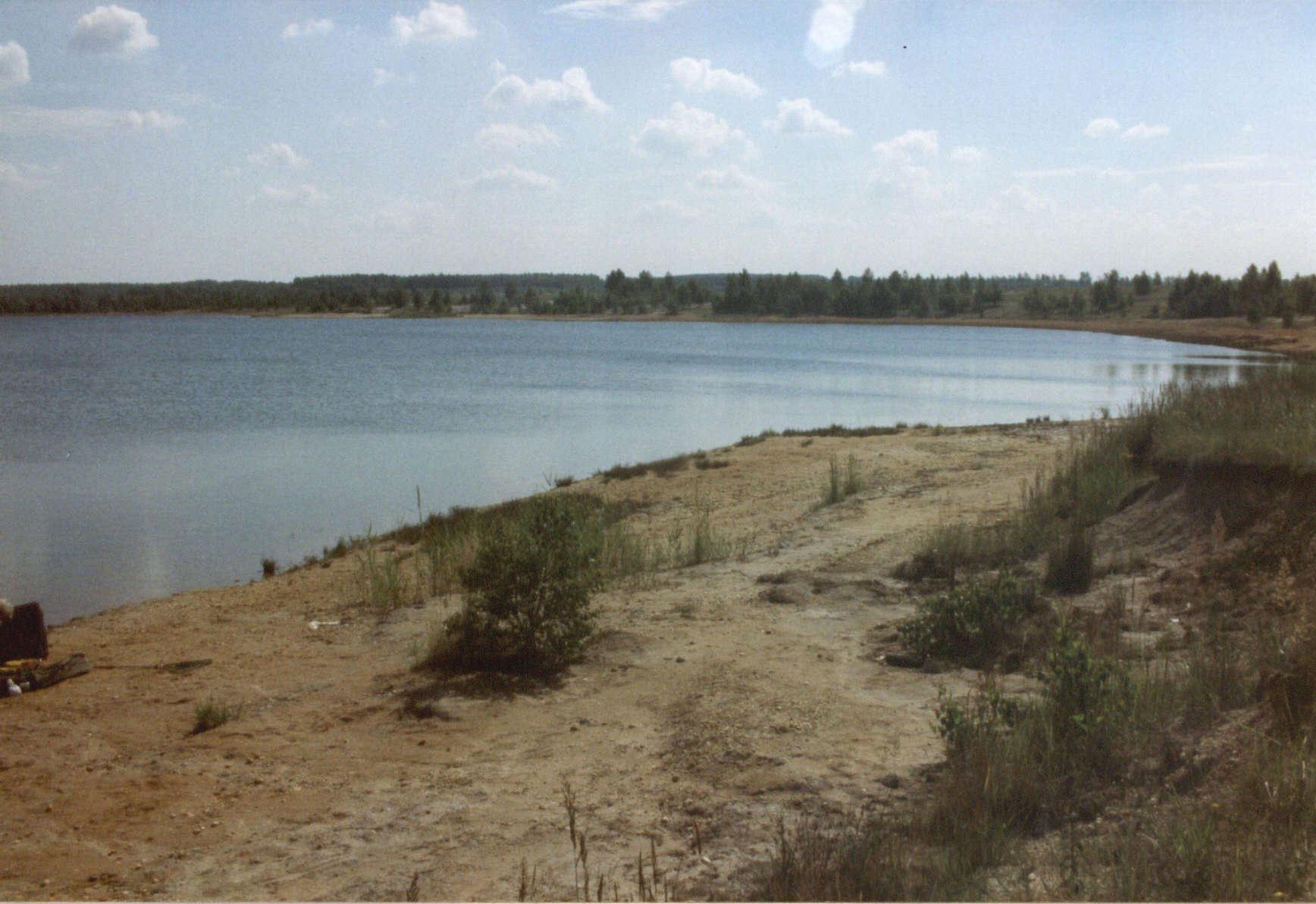
In 1998

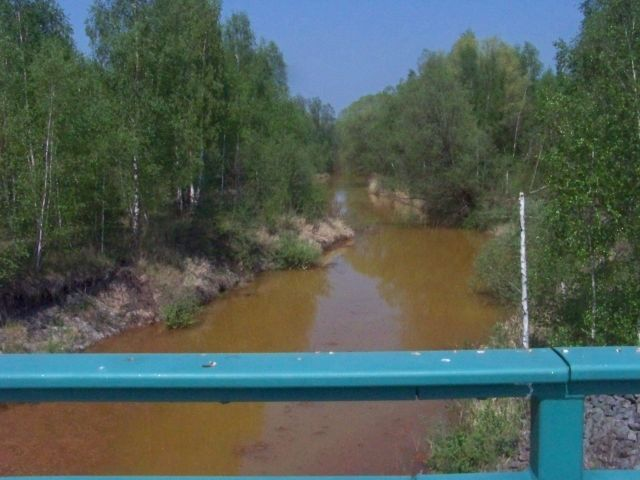
tributary river

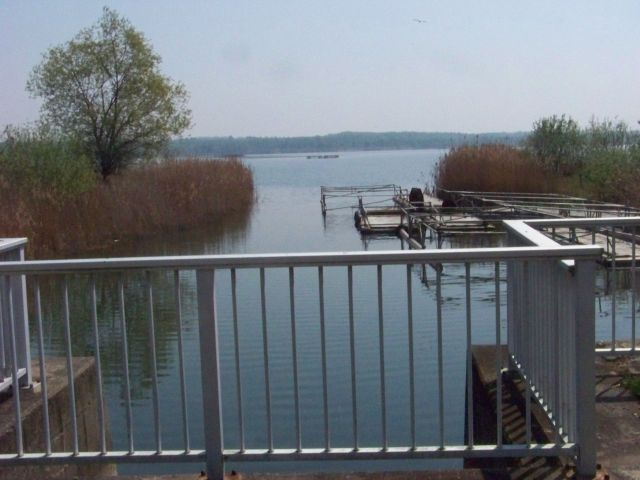
Abfluss des Speicherbeckens

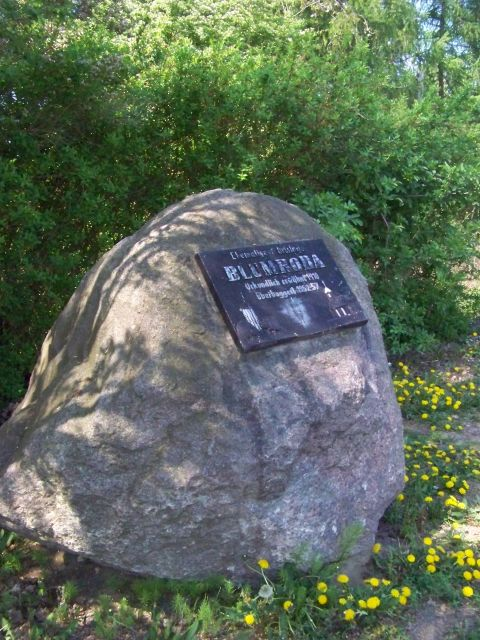
Plate commemorating the removal of the village of Blumroda
