= Speicherbecken Lohsa =

Lake in Saxony, Germany

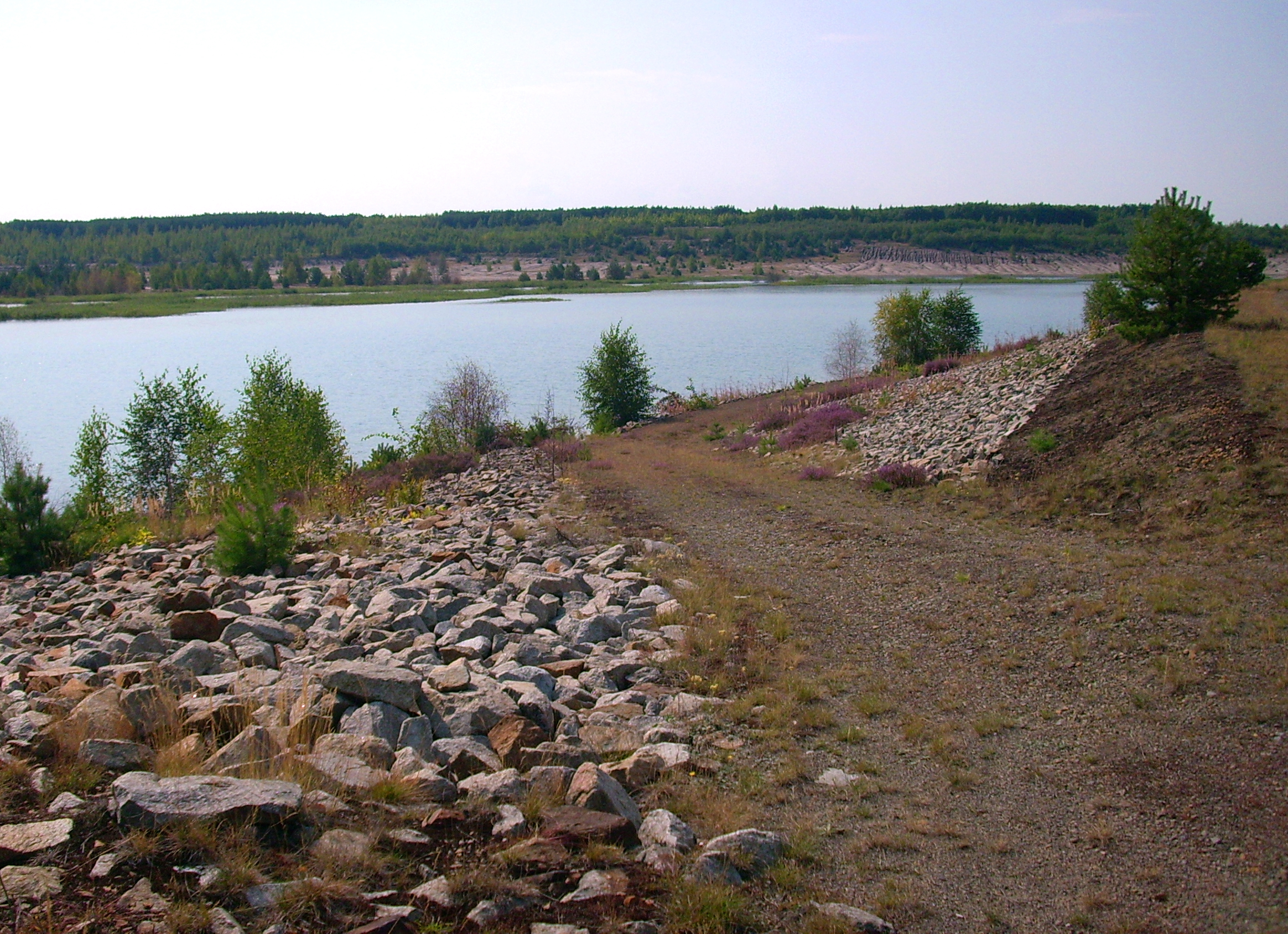

- Location within Saxony
- Location: Oberlausitz, Saxony
- Coordinates: 51°26′0″N 14°27′0″E
- Primary inflows: Spree
- Primary outflows: Spree
- Basin countries: Germany
- Surface area: 10.81 km^{2} (4.17 sq mi)
- Water volume: 97×10^{6} m^{3} (79,000 acre⋅ft)
- Surface elevation: 110.6 m (363 ft)

Speicherbecken Lohsa is a lake in Oberlausitz, Saxony, Germany. At an elevation of 110.6 m, its surface area is 10.81 km^{2}.
