= Intze principle =

The Intze Principle (German: Intze-Prinzip) is a name given to two engineering principles, both named after the hydraulic engineer, Otto Intze, (1843–1904). In one case, the Intze Principle relates to a type of water tower; in the other, a type of dam.

== Intze Principle for water towers ==
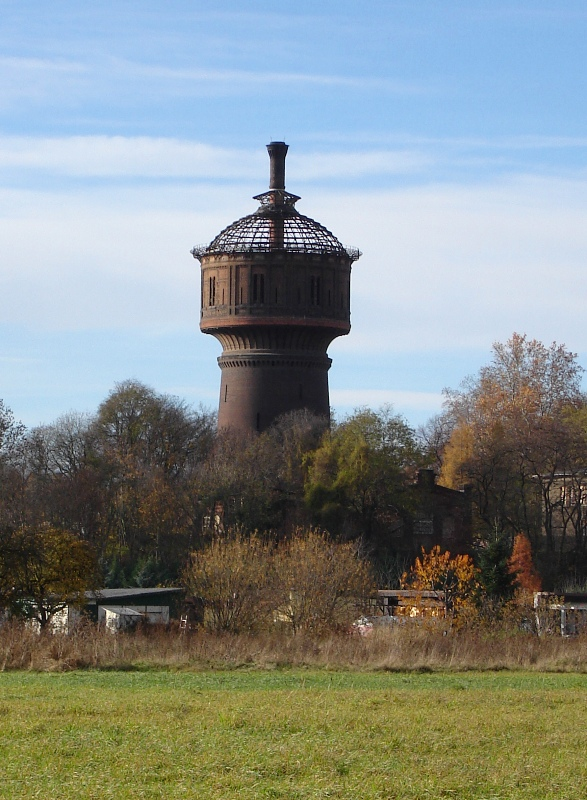
Salbke Water Tower built to the Intze Principle

A water tower built in accordance with the Intze Principle has a brick shaft on which the water tank sits. The base of the tank is fixed with a ring anchor (Ringanker) made of iron or steel, so that only vertical, not horizontal, forces are transmitted to the tower. Due to the lack of horizontal forces the tower shaft does not need to be quite as solidly built. This type of design was used in Germany between 1885 and 1905.

Water tanks designed on the Intze Principle

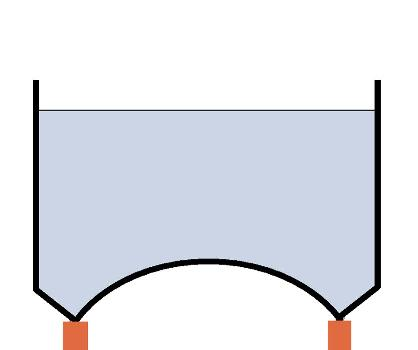
Intze 1 tank

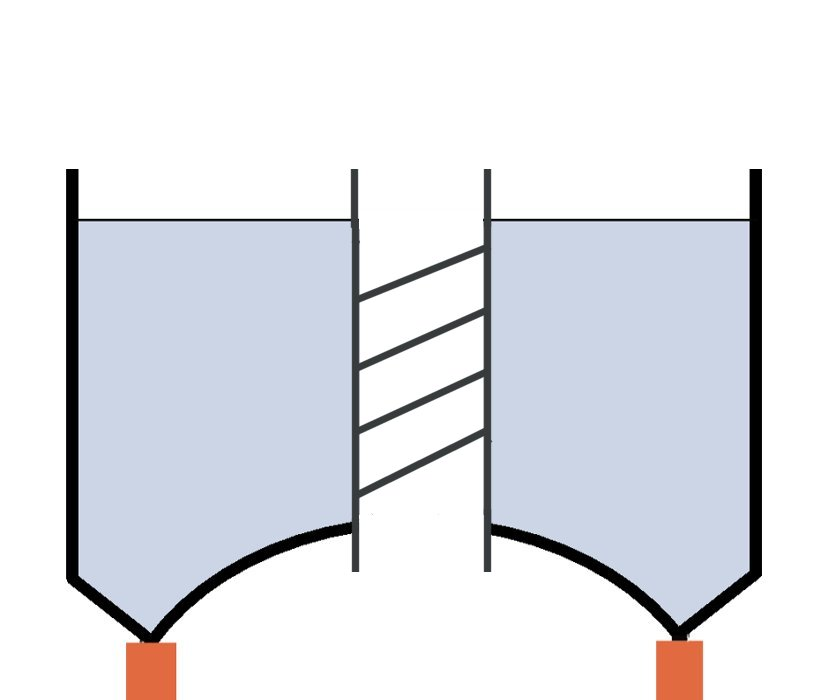
Intze 1 tank with inside cylinder

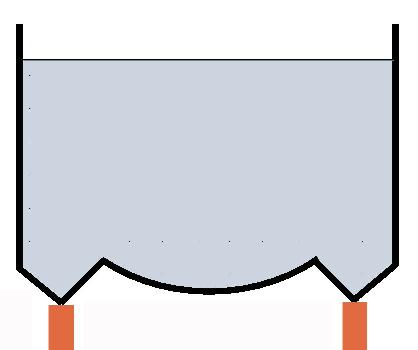
Intze 2 tank

== Intze Principle for dams ==
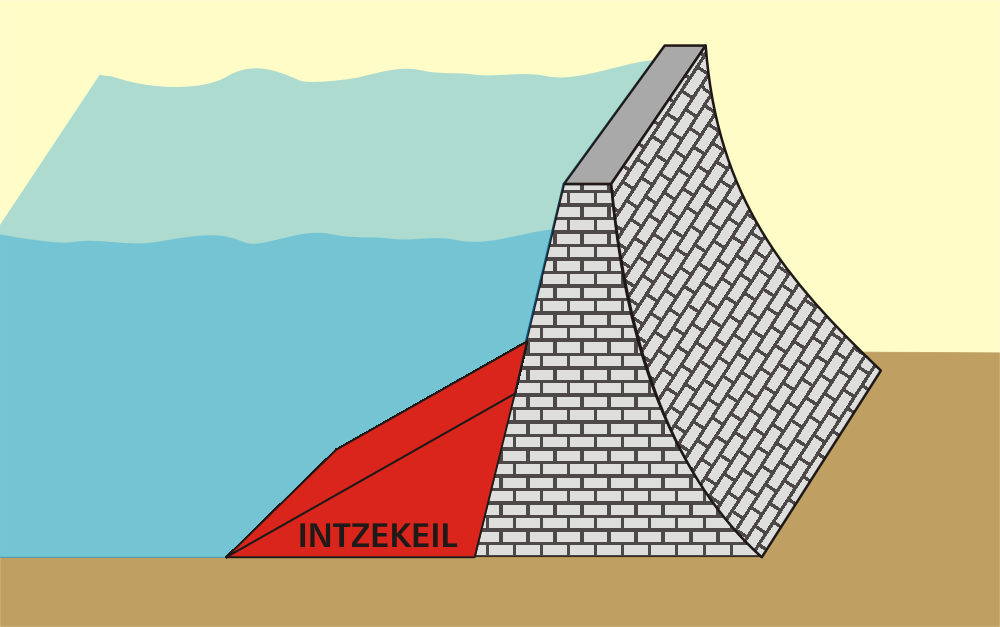
Intze wedge

The method of dam construction invented by Otto Intze was used in Germany at the end of the 19th and beginning of the 20th centuries. A dam built on the Intze Principle has the following features:

- it is a gravity dam with an almost triangular cross-section
- the wall is made of rubble stone with a high proportion of mortar
- it has a curved ground plan
- it has facing brickwork (Vorsatzmauerwerk or Verblendung) on the upper part of the upstream side
- it has an earth embankment against the lower part of the upstream side, the so-called Intze Wedge (Intze-Keil)
- it has a cement-sealed upstream face, coated with a layer of bitumen or tar
- it has internal vertical drainage using clay pipes behind the upstream face

The purpose of the Intze Wedge is to provide an additional seal in the area of the highest water pressure. During the 1920s, this type of construction was gradually superseded by concrete dams or arched dams which were cheaper to build.

== See also ==
- List of dams in Germany
