= Sosa Dam =

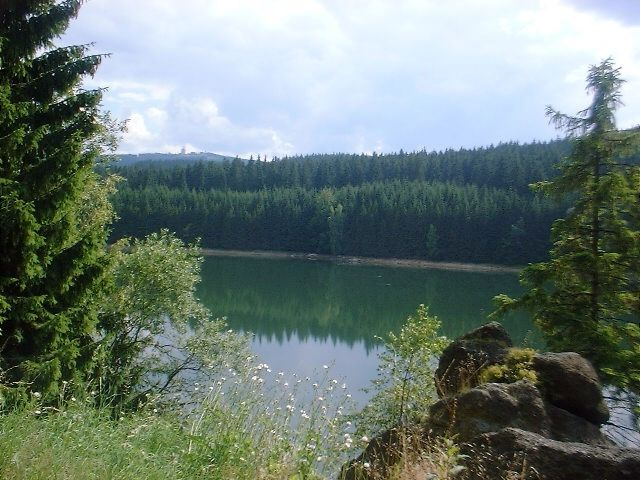
- Sosa Reservoir and the Auersberg
- Interactive map of Sosa Dam
- Location: Erzgebirgskreis
- Coordinates: 50.48806°N 12.64972°E
- Construction began: 1949-1952

Dam and spillways
- Impounds: Kleine Bockau
- Height (foundation): 58.40 m
- Height (thalweg): 49.10 m
- Length: 200 m (660 ft)
- Dam volume: 101,000 m^{3}

Reservoir
- Total capacity: 6.33 million m^{3}
- Active capacity: 5.94 million m^{3}
- Surface area: 39.3 ha

The Sosa Dam (German: Talsperre Sosa) is a dam in the Free State of Saxony in East Germany. It supplies drinking water to the Western Ore Mountains as well as acting as flood protection.

== History ==
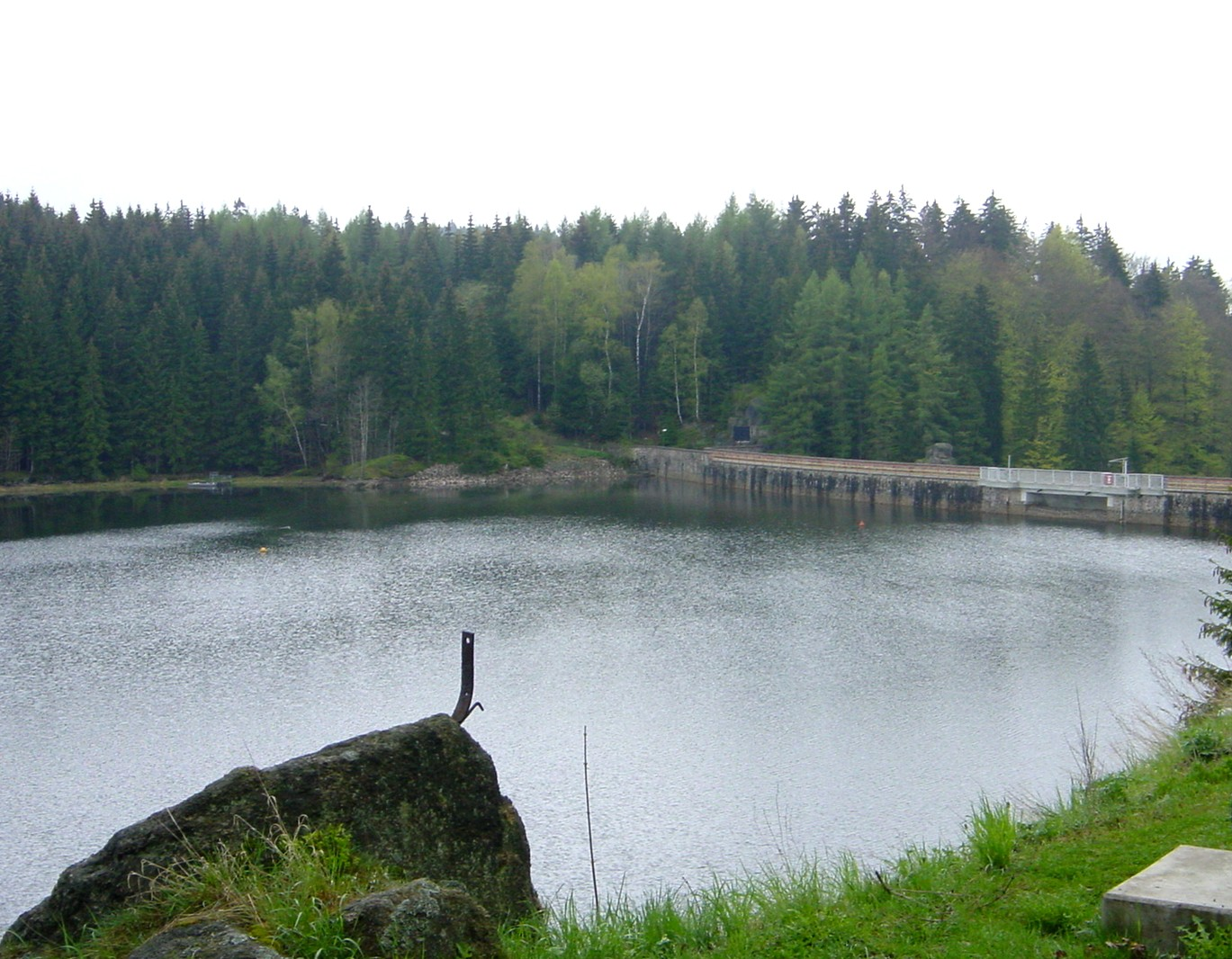
The reservoir and dam

The dam was built between 1949 and 1952 in the Höllengrund near Eibenstock in the Ore Mountains and taken into service in 1952. The dam itself is a crooked gravity dam made of quarrystone. It is the last dam of this type that was built in Germany. The impounded stream is the Kleine Bockau.

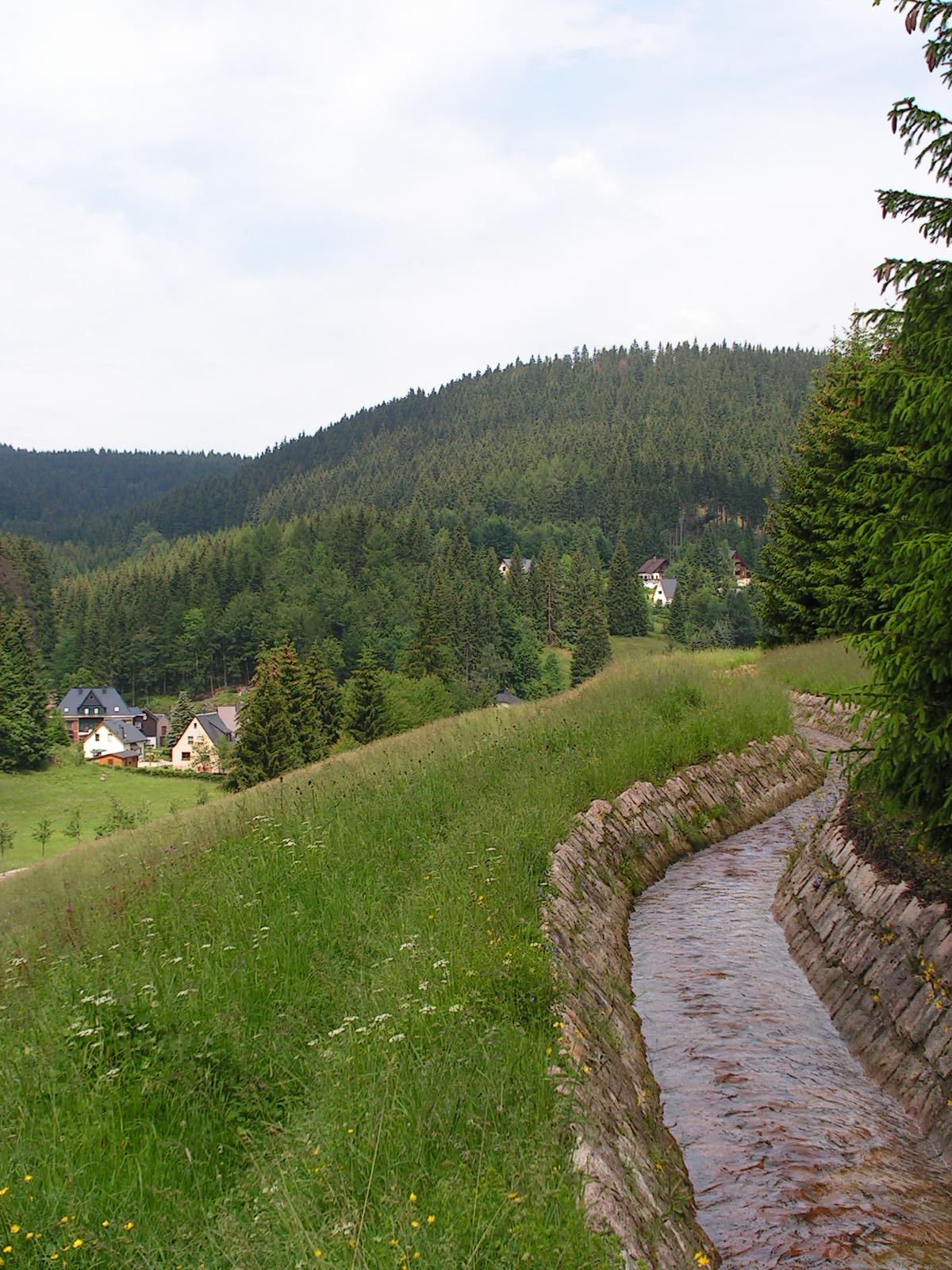
Hillside channel at Wildenthal

In addition the waters of the Große Bockau are diverted along a hillside channel west of the Auersberg from Oberwildenthal via Wildenthal to the reservoir.

Following the foundation of the state of East Germany, the construction of the dam was turned over to the Free German Youth as the first central youth objective within the first two-year plan. In view of the simple materials used for its construction it remains even today as technically impressive. Its realisation as a youth objective took on a strong ideological slant in the years that followed. The facility was given the sobriquet "Dam of Peace" (Talsperre des Friedens) and was mentioned in the Song of the Youth Brigades (Lied der Jugendbrigaden: "We provided water in Sosa...).

== Leisure use ==
No public ways run over the dam. Bathing, angling and leisure sports are not permitted, but there is a public footpath around the reservoir. There is a car park near the dam that can be accessed by road from Sosa.

== See also ==
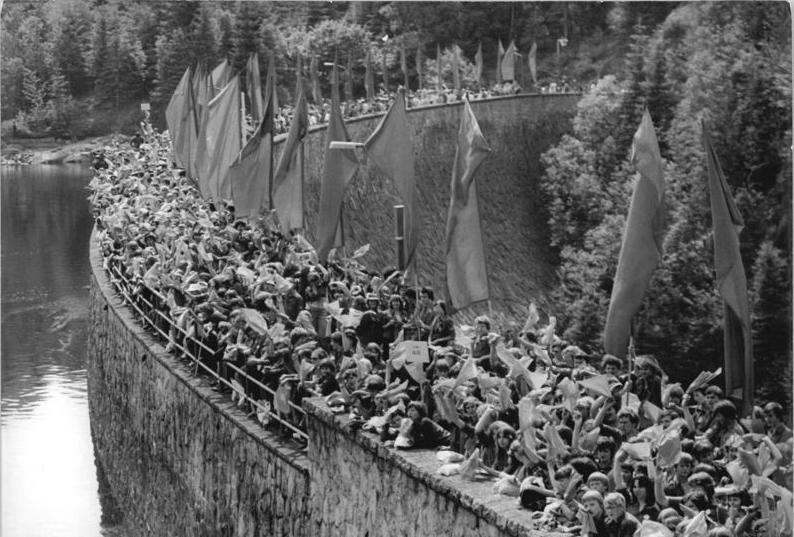
Gathering of the Free German Youth on the occasion of the 30th anniversary of the completion of the Sosa Dam (8 June 1981)

- Cranzahl Dam (Talsperre der Freundschaft)
- List of dams and reservoirs in Germany
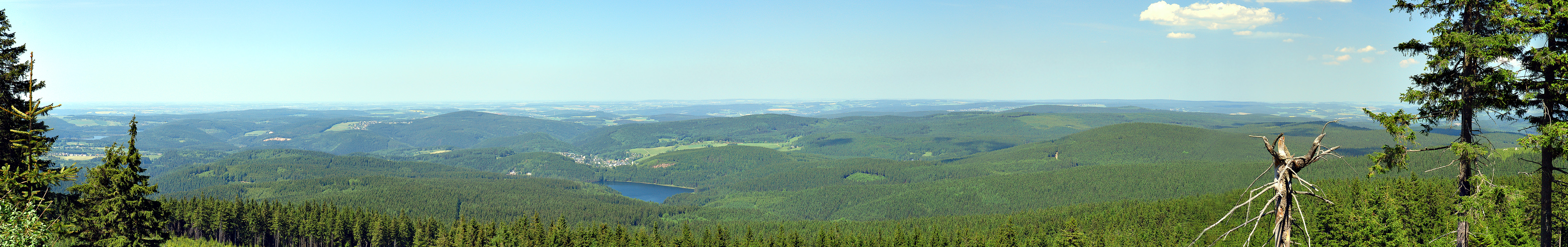
View of the reservoir from the Auersberg

== Sources ==
- Rainer Thiel: Der Stausee unterm Auersberg. Trafo-Verlag Weist, Berlin 2002, ISBN 3-89626-390-0
- Christian Wünsche (Hrsg.): Waren wir Helden!? Sosa-Erbauer erinnern sich. Berlin, 2002. Anfragen: Günter Krenkel, Rostock, Telefon: 0381-682394
- Kube, Walter: Mein Abenteuer Sosa | MDR.DE
