= Brückenberg =

Mountain in Germany

Coordinates: 50°27′15″N 12°36′30″E

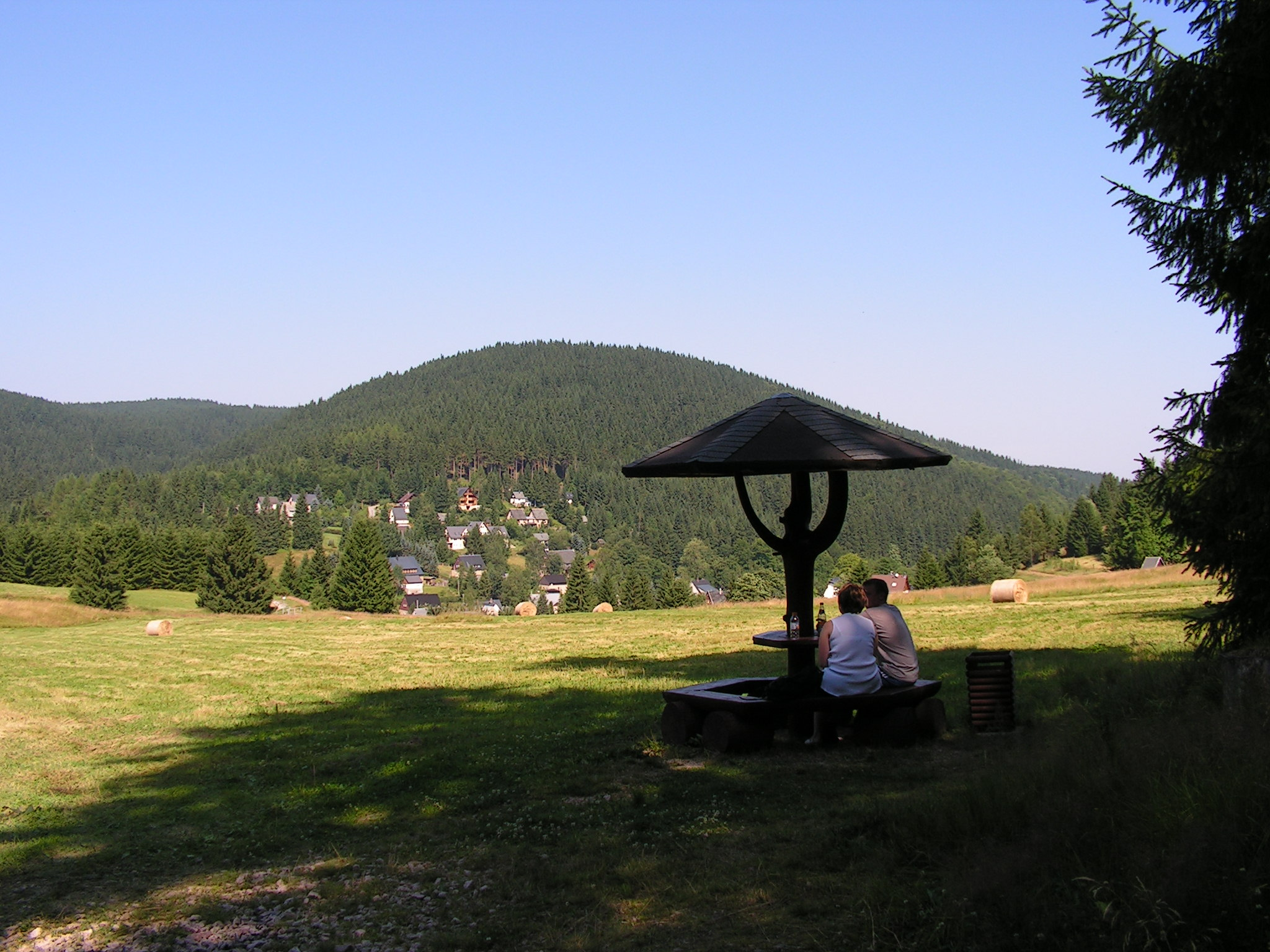
- Brückenberg (in the background) and elbows near Wildenthal

Highest point
- Elevation: 963.8 m (3,162 ft)

Geography
- Location: Saxony, Germany

Brückenberg is a mountain of Saxony, southeastern Germany. With an elevation of 963.8 m above NHN, it is considered one of the highest mountains in Saxon Ore Mountain Range.

== Geography and Location ==
Brückenberg is located in the West Ore Mountains, about 1 km (0.62 mi) to the west of Wildenthal and about 2 km (1.2 mi) in the north-northeast of Carlsfeld, two villages in the city of Eibenstock (district of Erzgebirgskreis). It is separated from the neighbouring mountain of Auersberg by the valley of the Große Bockau river.

A silver-bearing domeykite-ß (copper-deficient arsenide) has been reported to be found in Brückenberg.
