= Muldenhammer (Eibenstock) =

Muldenhammer Windischhammer, Windischthal
- Hamlet
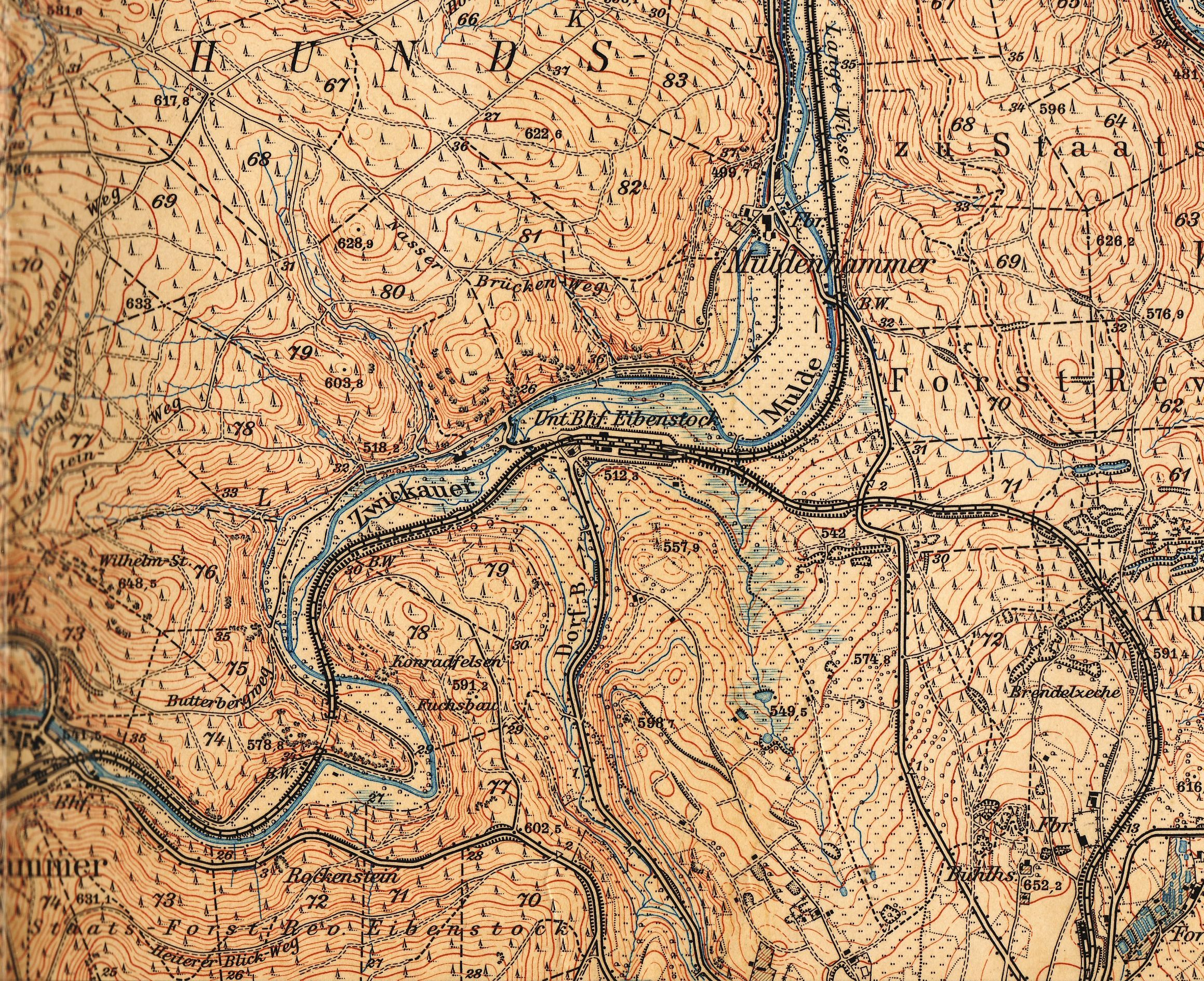
- Map of the area around 1900
- Nickname: Kleinhempel
- Muldenhammer in Saxony
- Coordinates: 50°31′10″N 12°35′13″E
- Country: Germany
- Federal state: Saxony
- District: Erzgebirgskreis
- Municipality: Eibenstock
- first mentioned: 16th century
- abandoned: 1974
- Named for: Zwickauer Mulde

Muldenhammer is a former subdivision of the town of Eibenstock in the Ore Mountains. It originated from an iron hammer forge, first mentioned in the 16th century and was abandoned in 1974 due to the construction of Eibenstock Dam.

== History ==
A trip hammer forge on the river Zwickauer Mulde was first mentioned in the 16th century as Hammer untern Eybenstock. The first known owner and master craftsman was Hans Dietz. Only goods for domestic use were produced under his management. Jacob Kleinhempel, the father-in-law of tax official and smeltery and forge owner Melchior Siegel (1515–1588), began to produce weapons in 1531.In 1568 the two men were among the first forge owners in the Ore Mountains who obtained the concession for a blast furnace. It was approximately six to eight metres tall and could produce about one tonne of pig iron per day. The forge remained the property of the Kleinhempel family until the middle of the 17th century, hence the nickname of the place. Later it changed into the hands of the families Uttenhove and Gottschald, in 1748 the owner was Johann Paul Vogel.

In 1788 the forge consisted of a blast furnace, two fining hearths and a tin smelter. When the owner of the hammers in Neidhardtsthal, Schönheiderhammer und Unterblauenthal acquired the rights to Muldenhammer in 1797, only a hammer for bar stock remained in operation there while the blast furnace was shut down. In 1819 Muldenhammer is described as a well-managed estate with 21 houses "in a deep and meandering, partly rocky, dark, but romantic valley above the mouth of Weißbach stream, neighbouring to Neidhardsthal".

The hammer estate and an inn remained as witnesses to the ironworking traditions well into the 20th century. Muldenhammer was considered part of Hundshübel until 1881 when the small industrial hamlet became an independent municipality. In 1939 it had 50 inhabitants. Muldenhammer was incorporated into Eibenstock on 1 October 1939. It had been parished there throughout its existence. When Eibenstock Dam was built (1974–1987), the inhabitants of the settlement had to be relocated because the ten residential buildings, the nearby paper mill and wood pulp factory and the large estate came to lie in the area that was flooded by the impoundment of Zwickauer Mulde and some of its tributaries.

== Bibliography ==
- Siegfried Sieber (1957). "Muldenhammer bei Eibenstock". Glückauf, Kultur- und Heimatblätter der Kreise AUE und Schneeberg. 4 (11): S. 207–209.
