= Hundshübel =

- Village of Stützengrün
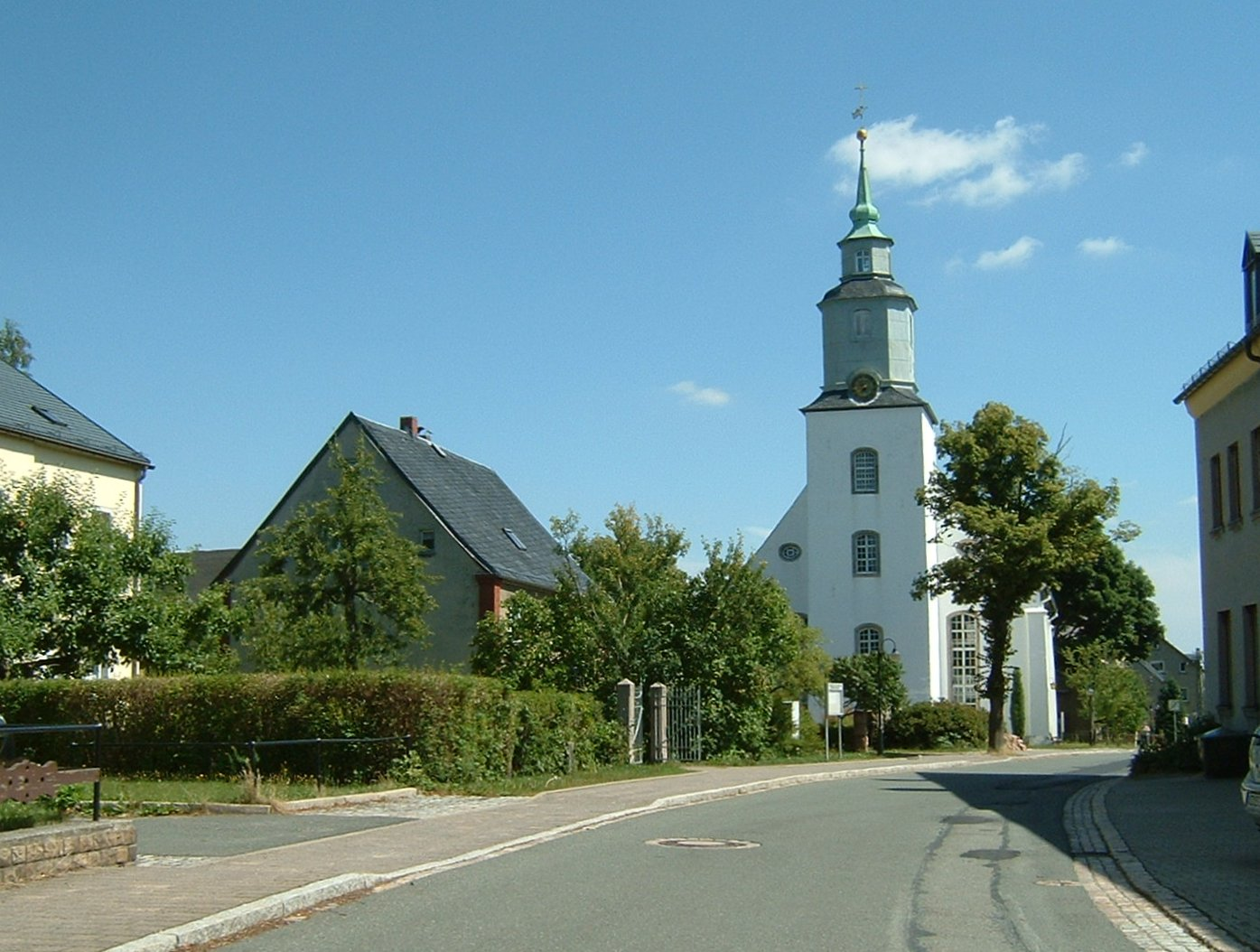
- Village centre with church
- Interactive map of Hundshübel
- Location within Germany Location within Saxony
- Coordinates: 50°32′50″N 12°34′26″E
- Country: Germany
- State: Saxony
- District: Erzgebirgskreis
- Municipality: Stützengrün
- First mentioned: 1533

Area
  - Total: 11.63 km^{2} (4.49 sq mi)
- Elevation: 559 m (1,834 ft)

Population (2011)
  - Total: 1,070
  - Density: 92.0/km^{2} (238/sq mi)
- Time zone: UTC+01:00 (CET)
  - Summer (DST): UTC+02:00 (CEST)
- Postal codes: 08328
- Dialling codes: 037462
- Vehicle registration: ERZ

Hundshübel is a village in Erzgebirgskreis district of Saxony, forming a subdivision of the municipality of Stützengrün in the Ore Mountains. It is located north of Eibenstock Dam on federal highway B 169.

== History ==
The village was first mentioned in writing as Hudesudell on the occasion of the sale of the Tettau noble family selling the surrounding lands to the House of Wettin in 1533. At this time, about ten farmer families were living there who originated from Eibenstock and went there to church. In 1563 there were 15 families, in 1563 already 22. The first wooden church, mentioned in 1545, was replaced by new building in 1558 which was financed by donations. After this had become dilapidated in the 18th century, a new church was built from 1784 until 1788.

When Prince-elector John the Magnanimous took over the lordship of Schwarzenberg, Lutheranism which had hitherto only slowly gained acceptance spread quickly.

In 1817 the main occupations were farming and animal husbandry, the inhabitants also manufactured bobbin lace, which were sold on the trade fairs of Leipzig and Braunschweig, or worked in mining, as wood cutters and as waggoners. The work of the local wainwrights was commended, and trade in iron articles was strong.

From 1952 to 1990, Hundshübel was part of the Bezirk Karl-Marx-Stadt of East Germany. On 1 January 1999 Hundshübel joined the municipality of Stützengrün.

== Population ==
| Year | Inhabitants |
|---|---|
| 1550/51 | 12 besessene Mann, 10 Häusler, 4 Inwohner (lodgers), 13½ Hufen |
| 1764 | 51 besessene Mann, 40 Häusler, 3½ Hufen |
| 1834 | 1163 |
| 1871 | 1371 |
| 1890 | 1340 |

| Year | Inhabitants |
|---|---|
| 1910 | 1688 |
| 1925 | 1625 |
| 1939 | 1619 |
| 1946 | 1654 |
| 1950 | 1793 |

| Year | Inhabitants |
|---|---|
| 1964 | 1662 |
| 1990 | 1310 |
| 1998 | 1251 |

== Religion ==
The Lutheran parish of Hundshübel is part of the ecclesiastical district of Aue. Initially the village was part of Eibenstock parish, from 1545 until 1769 it belonged to Bärenwalde church parish. From 1770 on Hundshübel has had an own pastor.

The organisationally independent Landeskirchliche Gemeinschaft of Hundshübel is part of district Auerbach (Vogtland) of Landesverband Landeskirchlicher Gemeinschaften Sachsen.

== Buildings and attractions ==
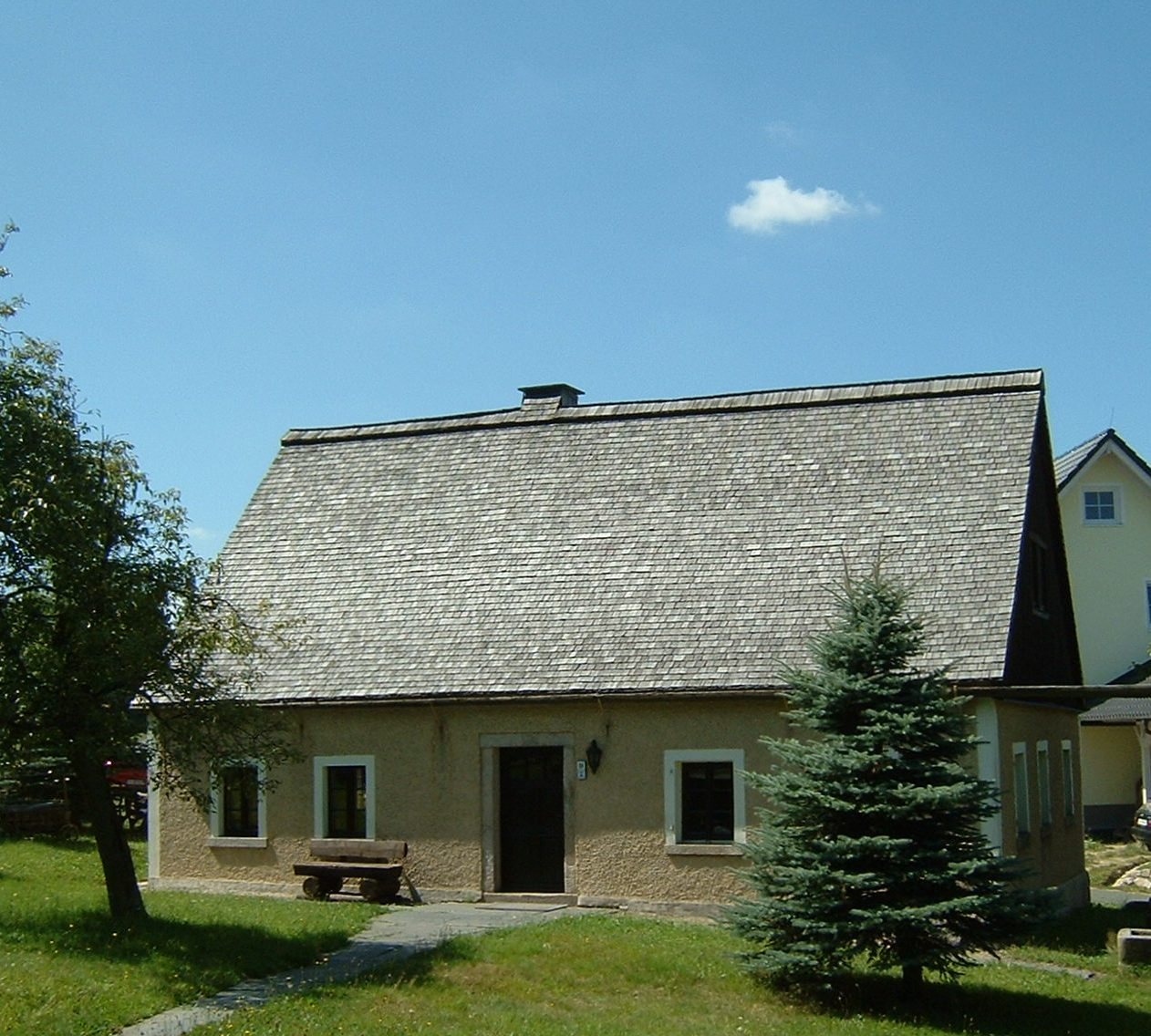
Nadlerhaus

- The church with its wooden ceiling above a single nave retains the belfry of its predecessor building. Although architectonically unremarkable, it contains a brass baptismal font from around 1500, a wooden baptistery of 1792 and a copper chalice of 1760, the latter two being considered good examples of Rococo craftsmanship.
- The Nadlerhaus ("needlemaker's house") is a former labourers' cottage, is home to a small local museum.
- The shaving museum with more than 2000 exhibits is located in a former manufacturing facility.
- Several hiking trails around Eibenstock Dam, two facilities for Kneipp cures, and a ski run with a surface lift serve tourism.

== Infrastructure ==
Until 2010, federal highway B 169 passed through the village. It was re-routed north of the village towards Lichtenau to avoid possible contamination of Eibenstock dam in the area of Hundshübel auxiliary dam, and parts of the old route were closed to traffic.

== Notable people ==
- Heinz Rosner, motorcycle racer and entrepreneur

== Bibliography ==
- Schumann, August (1817). "Hundshübel, Hundeshübel". Vollständiges Staats-, Post- und Zeitungslexikon von Sachsen (in German). Vol. 4. Zwickau. p. 256.
- Siegfried Sieber: Die Bergbaulandschaft von Schneeberg und Eibenstock. Edition no. 1 Akademie-Verlag Berlin, Berlin 1967 (Werte der deutschen Heimat. Vol. 11).
- Arno Lippold (1925). Chronik von Hundshübel im Erzgebirge. Hundshübel.
- Karl Friedrich Schreyer (1889). Chronik des Kirchdorfes Hundshübel. Zwickau.
- Die Inspektionen Chemnitz, Stollberg, Zwickau und Neustädtel. Sachsens Kirchengalerie. Vol. Band 8. Dresden: Hermann Schmidt. 1842. p. 62.
- Neue Sächsische Kirchengalerie. Die Parochie Schönheide- Hundshübel- Sosa- Stützengrün. Leipzig. 1902.

== Links ==
- Hundshübel in the Digital Historic Index of Places in Saxony (Digitales Historisches Ortsverzeichnis von Sachsen)
