= Stützengrün =

- Municipality
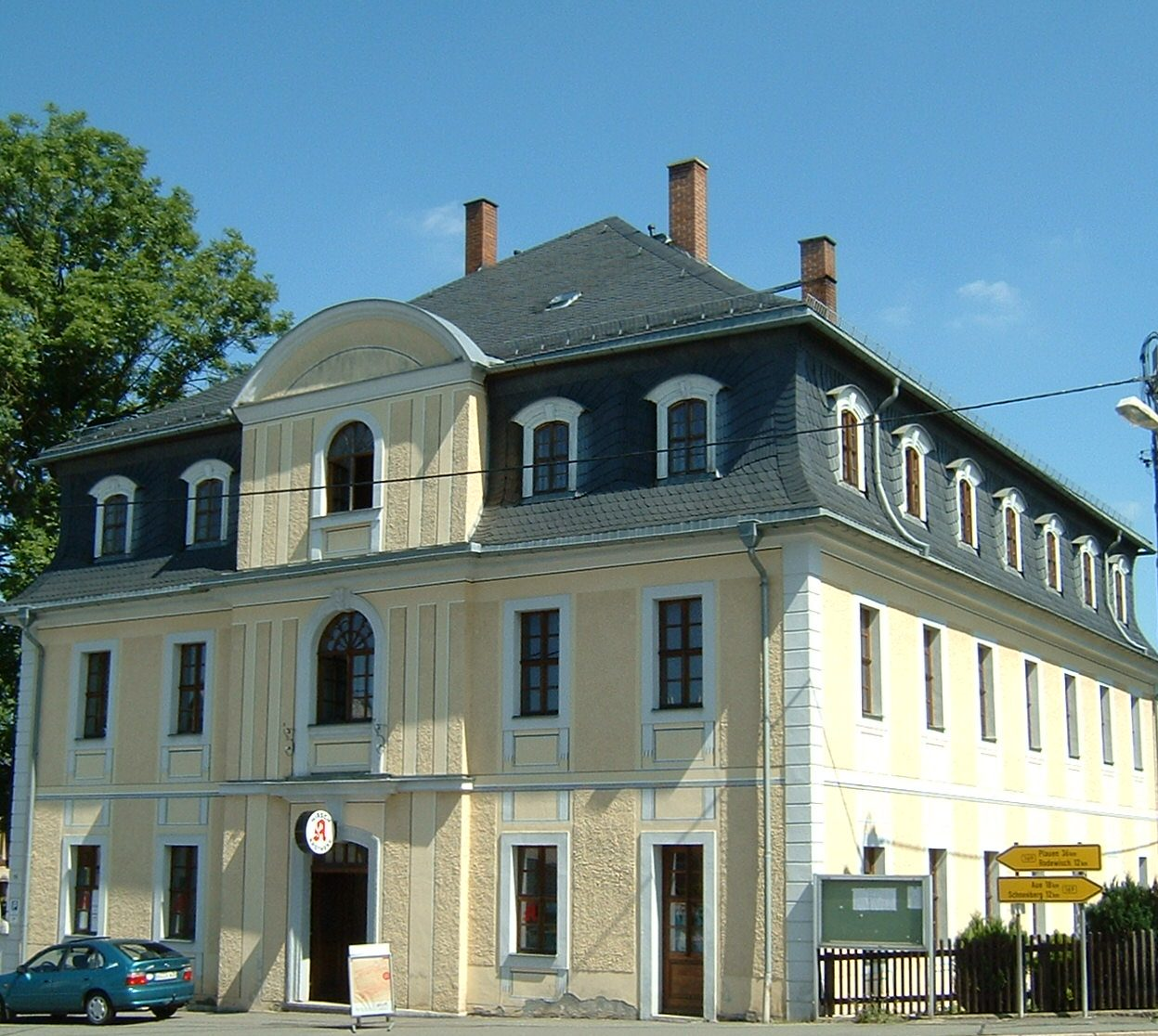
- Baroque style house in Stützengrün

- Coat of arms

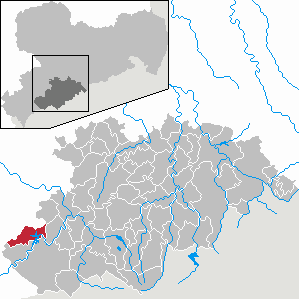
- Location of Stützengrün within Erzgebirgskreis district
- Interactive map of Stützengrün
- Location within Germany Location within Saxony
- Coordinates: 50°32′4″N 12°31′34″E
- Country: Germany
- State: Saxony
- District: Erzgebirgskreis
- Subdivisions: 3

Government
  - Mayor (2021–28): Volkmar Viehweg (CDU)

Area
  - Total: 28.36 km^{2} (10.95 sq mi)
- Elevation: 584 m (1,916 ft)

Population (2025-12-31)
  - Total: 3,015
  - Density: 106.3/km^{2} (275.3/sq mi)
- Time zone: UTC+01:00 (CET)
  - Summer (DST): UTC+02:00 (CEST)
- Postal codes: 08328
- Dialling codes: 037462
- Vehicle registration: ERZ, ANA, ASZ, AU, MAB, MEK, STL, SZB, ZP
- Website: www.stuetzengruen.de

Stützengrün is a community in the district of Erzgebirgskreis, Saxony, Germany.

== Geography ==
=== Location ===
Stützengrün is in the Ore Mountains, directly on the border with the Vogtland. In Stützengrün is found the Weißbach, a stream which flows into the Eibenstock Reservoir.

== Geology ==
The community lies on a hilly plateau of Eibenstock tourmaline-granite and stretches from a height of 570 up to 680 metres above sea level.

=== Constituent communities ===
Along with the namesake community of Stützengrün, the municipal area also includes the former municipalities of Hundshübel and Lichtenau.

== History ==
From 1952 to 1990, Stützengrün was part of the Bezirk Karl-Marx-Stadt of East Germany.

Population (31 December):

- 1971 - 2,863
- 1998 - 4,092
- 1999 - 4,085
- 2000 - 4,004
- 2001 - 3,976
- 2002 - 3,981
- 2003 - 3,941
- 2004 - 3,842
- 2005 - 3,806
- 2006 - 3,771

Source as of 1998: Statistisches Landesamt des Freistaates Sachsen

== Politics ==
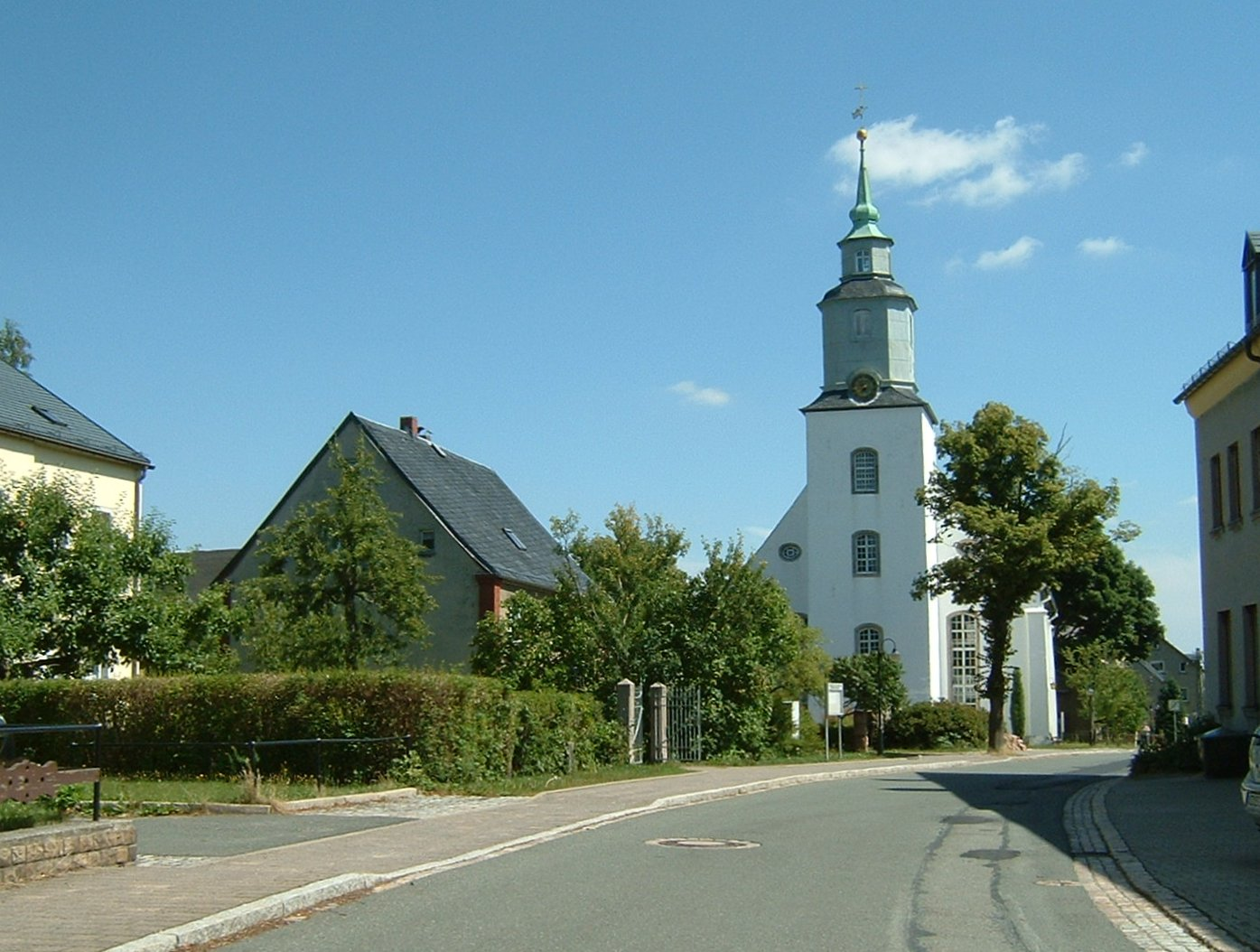
Country subdivision Hundshuebel

Volkmar Viehweg was elected at the mayoral election on 31 August 2014. He succeeded Birgit Reichel (CDU), who had been mayor for 14 years.

== Culture and sightseeing ==
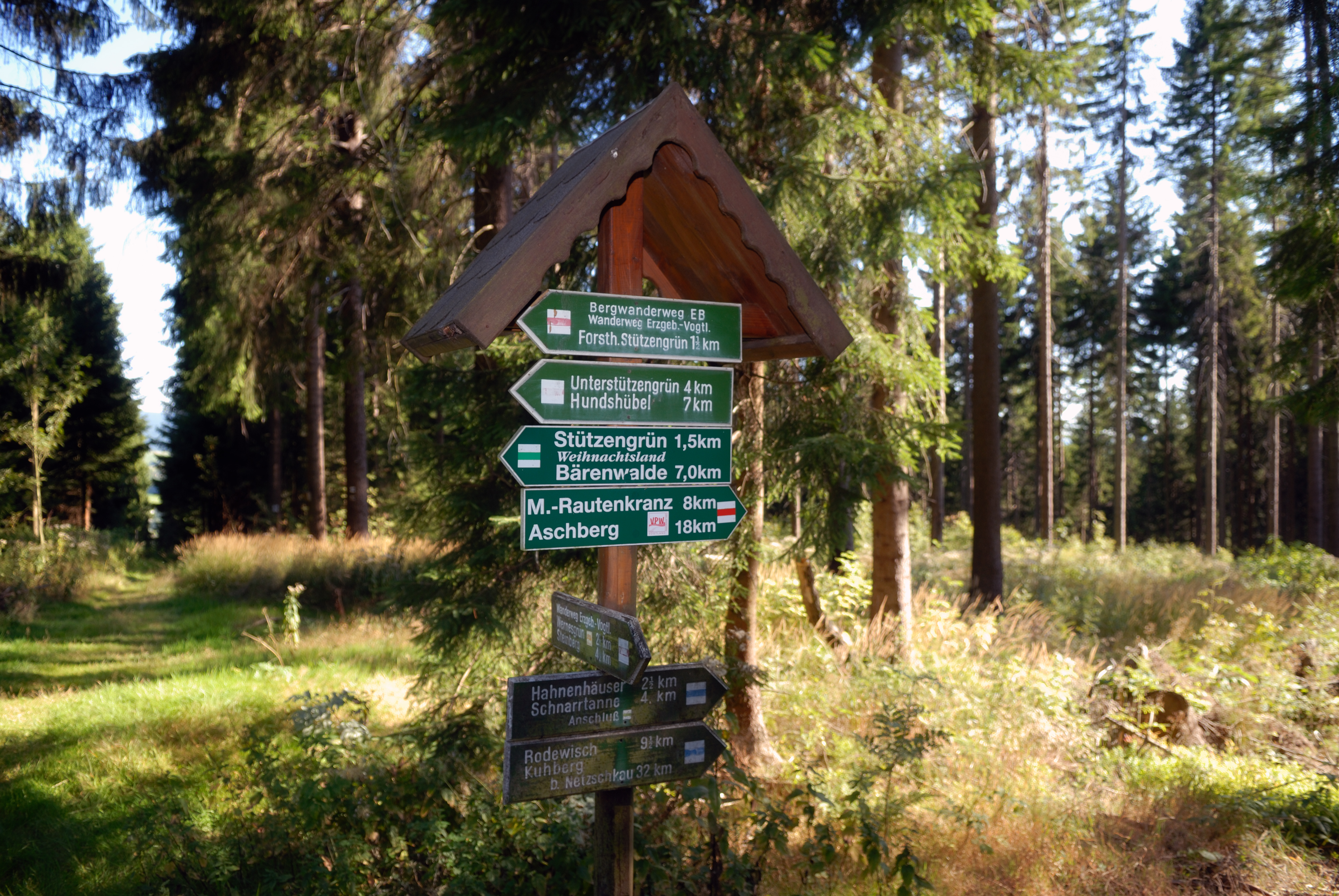
On the Kuhberg

Right on Bundesstraße 169, which runs through the community, is the Bauernbarockkirche (“Baroque Farmers’ Church”), built in 1701 and now a protected monument. It has a carved altar and a 130-year-old Jehmlich organ.

A further attraction in the community is the 795-m-high Kuhberg (“Cow Mountain”) with the Prinz-Georg-Turm (tower) which affords an unrivalled view of the neighbouring communities. Moreover, the Bergwiesenerlebnispfad (“Mountain Meadow Experience Path”), which features indigenous vegetation and Scottish Highland cattle, makes for an inviting walk.

== Economy and infrastructure ==
=== Transport ===
Stützengrün lies on Bundesstraße 169. Until the 1970s, the community was connected to the railway by the narrow-gauge line from Wilkau-Haßlau to Carlsfeld. In 1997, the stretch to Schönheide was rebuilt and has since been run as a museum railway.

=== Education ===
The elementary school at Stützengrün on Schulstraße (“School Street”) serves the local schooling needs.

== See also ==
- Media related to Stützengrün at Wikimedia Commons
