= Daniel Hecht (disambiguation) =

Daniel Hecht is the name of:

- Daniel Hecht, American novelist
- Danny Hecht, fictional character in Alias TV show
- Daniel Friedrich Hecht, mathematician
