= Sosa, Germany =

Sosa
- Ortsteil of Eibenstock
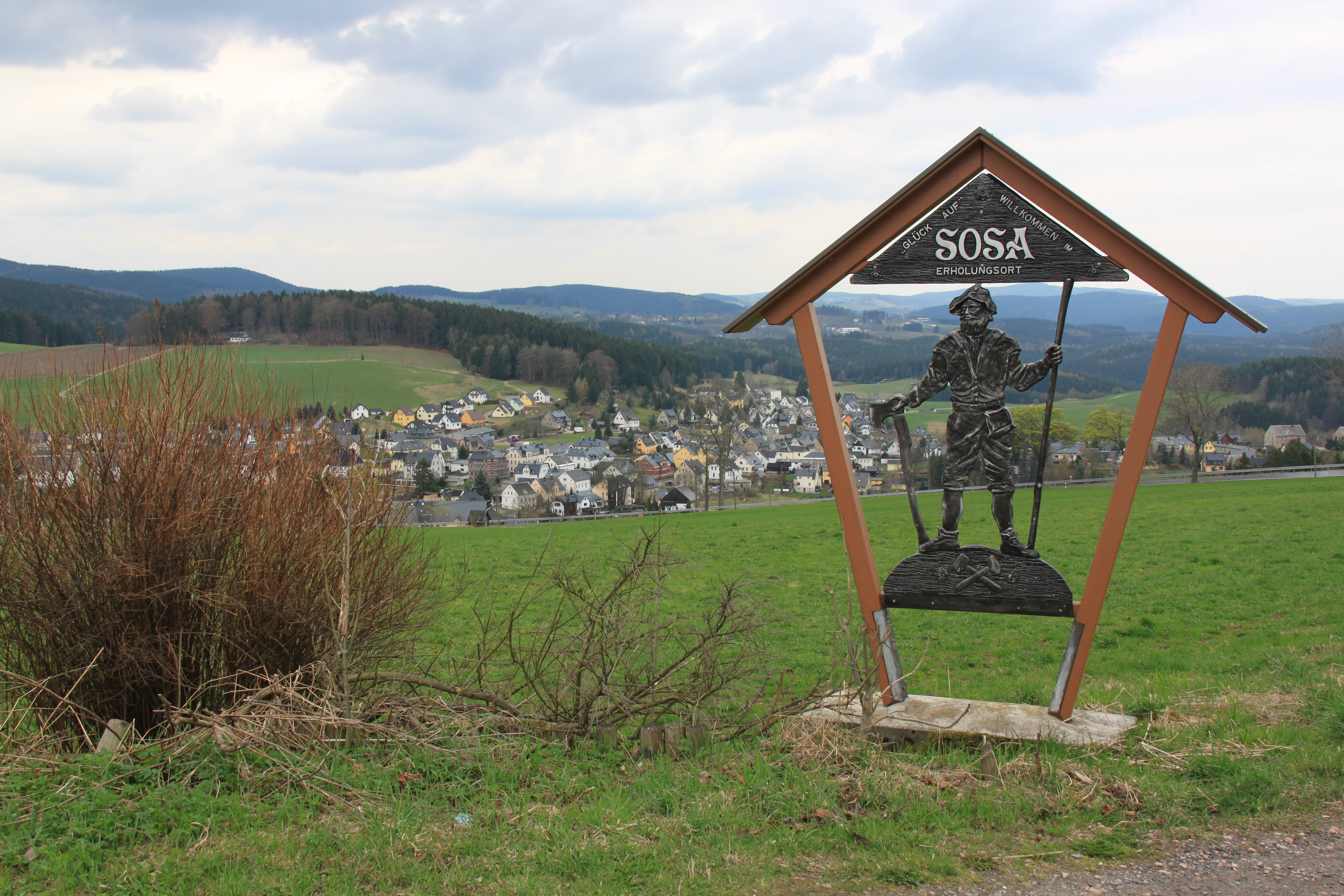
- Interactive map of Sosa
- Location within Germany Location within Saxony
- Coordinates: 50°29′57″N 12°39′7″E
- Country: Germany
- State: Saxony
- District: Erzgebirgskreis
- Town: Eibenstock

Area
  - Total: 21.99 km^{2} (8.49 sq mi)
- Elevation: 714 m (2,343 ft)

Population (2011)
  - Total: 2,046
  - Density: 93.04/km^{2} (241.0/sq mi)
- Time zone: UTC+01:00 (CET)
  - Summer (DST): UTC+02:00 (CEST)
- Postal codes: 08326
- Dialling codes: 037752
- Vehicle registration: ERZ
- Website: www.sosa.de

Sosa is a former municipality in the western Ore Mountains, in the Erzgebirgskreis, Saxony, Germany. It is a state-recognized health resort, that has belonged to the town Eibenstock since 1 January 2011.

== Geography ==
Sosa lies on both sides of the like-named Sosabach at an elevation of between 550 and 817 m above sea level. Also in the community is the Rote Grube (“Red Mine”).

== History ==
Sosa began as a forest village (Waldhufendorf). In 1453 it was first mentioned as Sossaw, although its beginnings are believed to have been in the 13th century. The people originally worked the land; however, from the 18th century onwards, mining gained in importance. In the second half of the 19th century, mining was diminishing in importance, and many migrated to the Zwickau coalfields. There was a short revival between 1947 and 1956 when the Soviet-German Wismut Corporation (Sowjetisch-Deutsche Aktiengesellschaft Wismut, or SDAG Wismut) mined uranium here, bringing about a new upswing. From 1952 to 1990, Sosa was part of the Bezirk Karl-Marx-Stadt of East Germany.

=== Population development ===
Development of population figures (31 December):

Historical population
Year	Pop.	±%
1971	2,709	—
1998	2,311	−14.7%
1999	2,330	+0.8%
2000	2,321	−0.4%
2001	2,287	−1.5%
2002	2,273	−0.6%
2003	2,248	−1.1%
2004	2,189	−2.6%
2005	2,157	−1.5%
2006	2,137	−0.9%

Source from 1998 on: Statistisches Landesamt des Freistaates Sachsen

== Culture and sightseeing ==
Between 1949 and 1952, the Sosa Reservoir was built. Its dam is almost 60 m high and its area is 39.3 ha.

=== Notable people ===
- Ludwig Güttler (b. 1943), trumpet virtuoso
- Daniel Friedrich Hecht (1777–1833), mathematician
