= Cranzahl Dam =

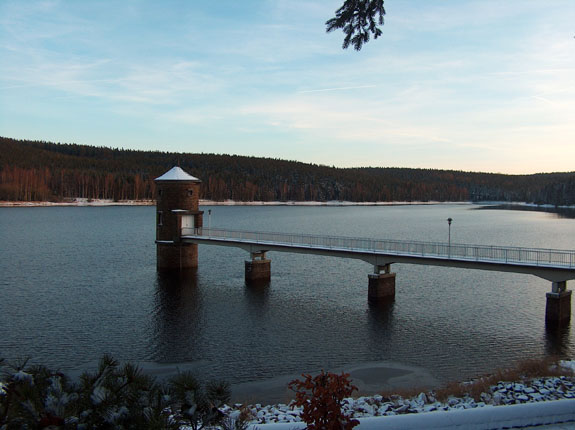
- Cranzahl Dam, December 2006
- Interactive map of Cranzahl Dam
- Location: Erzgebirgskreis, Saxony, Germany
- Coordinates: 50.50389°N 13.00361°E
- Construction began: 1949–1952

Dam and spillways
- Type of dam: earth-fill dam
- Impounds: Lampertsbach, Moritzbach
- Height (foundation): 36 m (118 ft)
- Height (thalweg): 32 m (105 ft)
- Length: 428 m (1,404 ft)
- Elevation at crest: 717 m (2,352 ft)
- Width (crest): 6 m (20 ft)
- Dam volume: 335,000 m^{3} (11,800,000 cu ft)

Reservoir
- Total capacity: 3.2×10^{6} m^{3} (110×10^{6} cu ft)
- Active capacity: 3.1×10^{6} m^{3} (110×10^{6} cu ft)
- Catchment area: 9.25 km^{2} (3.57 sq mi)
- Surface area: 35 ha (86 acres)
- Normal elevation: 715.05 m (2,346.0 ft)

Cranzahl Dam (German: Talsperre Cranzahl) is a dam in the Free State of Saxony in East Germany. It was built from 1949 to 1952 near Sehmatal–Cranzahl and the Bärenstein mountain in the Ore Mountains to supply drinking water to Annaberg-Buchholz and the surrounding area. Together with the Sosa Dam it was one of the two biggest dam construction projects of the newly created GDR. In keeping with the time it was called the Dam of Friendship (Talsperre der Freundschaft).

The actual dam itself is a crooked earth-fill dam with a sloping inner seal of loam. It is a large dam based on ICOLD criteria. The streams impounded by it are the Lampertsbach and the Moritzbach.

A trafficable track runs along the dam crest (482metres). Bathing and water sports in the reservoir are not permitted. However, there is a circular path of 3.5 kilometres for walkers, mountain-bikers and skiers.

== See also ==
- List of dams in Germany
