= Paul Drews =

German Lutheran theologian

Paul Gottfried Drews (8 May 1858, Eibenstock, Kingdom of Saxony – 1 August 1912, Halle) was a German Lutheran theologian.

He studied theology at the Thomasschule zu Leipzig and at the University of Göttingen, then served as a pastor in Burkau (from 1883) and Dresden (from 1889). In 1894 he became an associate professor of practical theology at the University of Jena, followed by full professorships at Giessen (from 1901) and Halle (from 1908).

== Literary works ==
- Wilibald Pirkheimers stellung zur reformation; ein beitrag zur beurteilung des verhältnisses zwischen humanismus und reformation, 1887 – Willibald Pirckheimer's position on the Reformation.
- Disputationen Dr. Martin Luthers : in d. J. 1535-1545 an der Universität Wittenberg gehalten, 1895 – Disputations of Martin Luther in 1535–1545 at the University of Wittenberg.
- Zur Entstehungsgeschichte des Kanons in der roemischen Messe, 1902 – The genesis of the canon in the Roman Mass.
- Der evangelische Geistliche in der deutschen Vergangenheit, 1905 – The Protestant clergyman in the German past.
- Augustin: De catechizandis rudibus, 1909 – The "Catechizandis Rudibus" of Saint Aurelius Augustine of Hippo.
- Das Problem der praktischen Theologie, 1910 – The problem of practical theology.
