= Kleine Bockau =

River in Germany

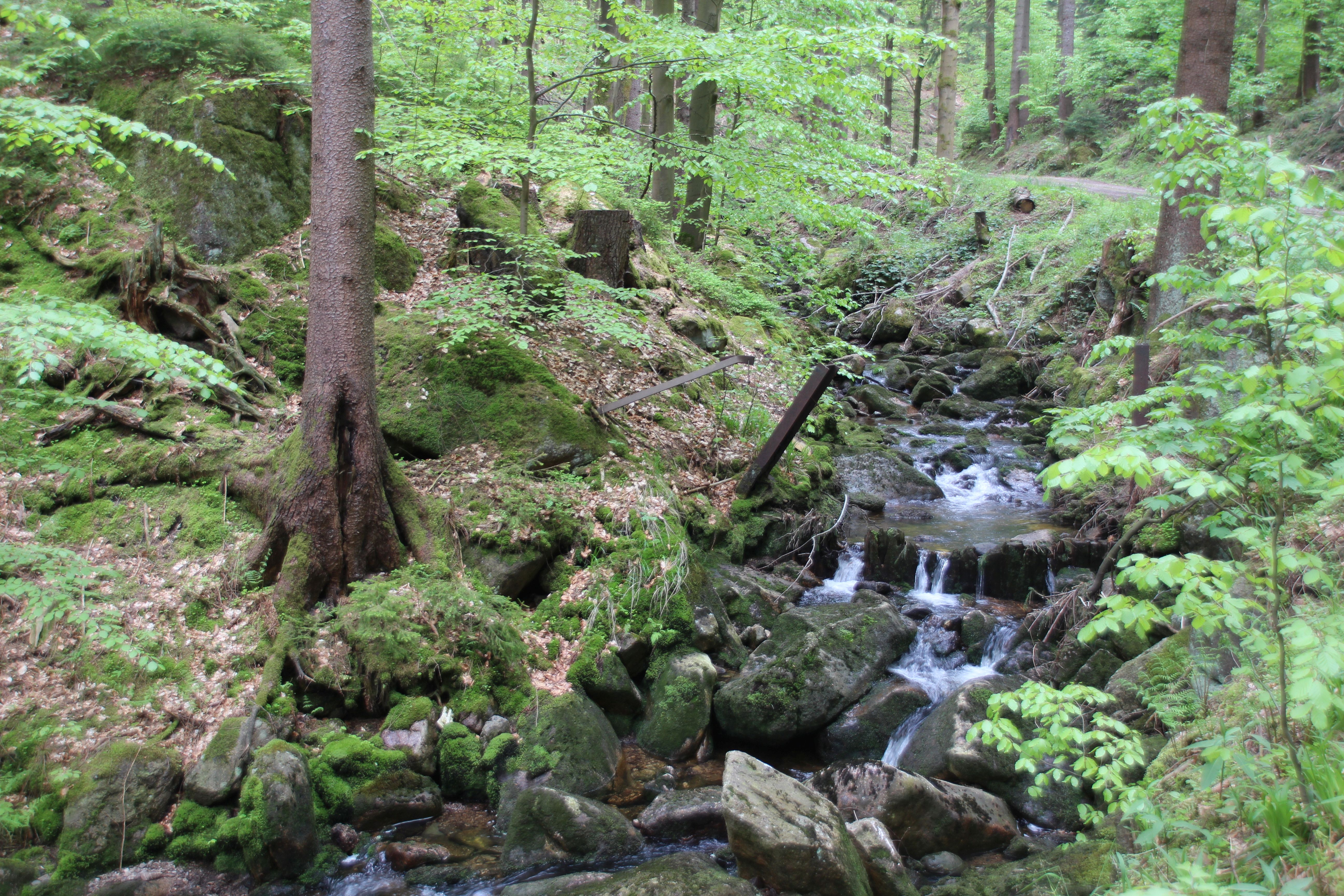

Location
- Country: Germany
- States: Saxony

Physical characteristics
- Mouth
  - location: Große Bockau
  - coordinates: 50.4997°N 12.6264°E

Basin features
- Progression: Große Bockau→ Zwickauer Mulde→ Mulde→ Elbe→ North Sea

The Kleine Bockau is a right tributary of the Große Bockau in the Western Ore Mountains in the Free State of Saxony. According to the natural region map of Saxony, the "Valley of the Kleine Bockau" constitutes its own microgeochore and is part of the mesogeochore "Eibenstock Ridge".

== Name Etymology ==
The name is derived from the Old Sorbian word Bukova, meaning beech water. In the Saxon mile sheets of 1791, the river is still called "Kleine Buckau" (Little Buckau). Neither the Kleine nor the Große Bockau flows through the municipality of Bockau; this village lies in a different valley further northeast

== See also ==
- List of rivers of Saxony
