= Wildenthal (Eibenstock) =

- Ortsteil of Eibenstock
- Interactive map of Wildenthal
- Location within Germany Location within Saxony
- Coordinates: 50°27′03″N 12°38′10″E
- Country: Germany
- State: Saxony
- District: Erzgebirgskreis
- Town: Eibenstock
- Elevation: 720–1,019 m (2,362–3,343 ft)

Population (2011)
  - Total: 264
- Time zone: UTC+01:00 (CET)
  - Summer (DST): UTC+02:00 (CEST)
- Postal codes: 08309
- Dialling codes: 037752

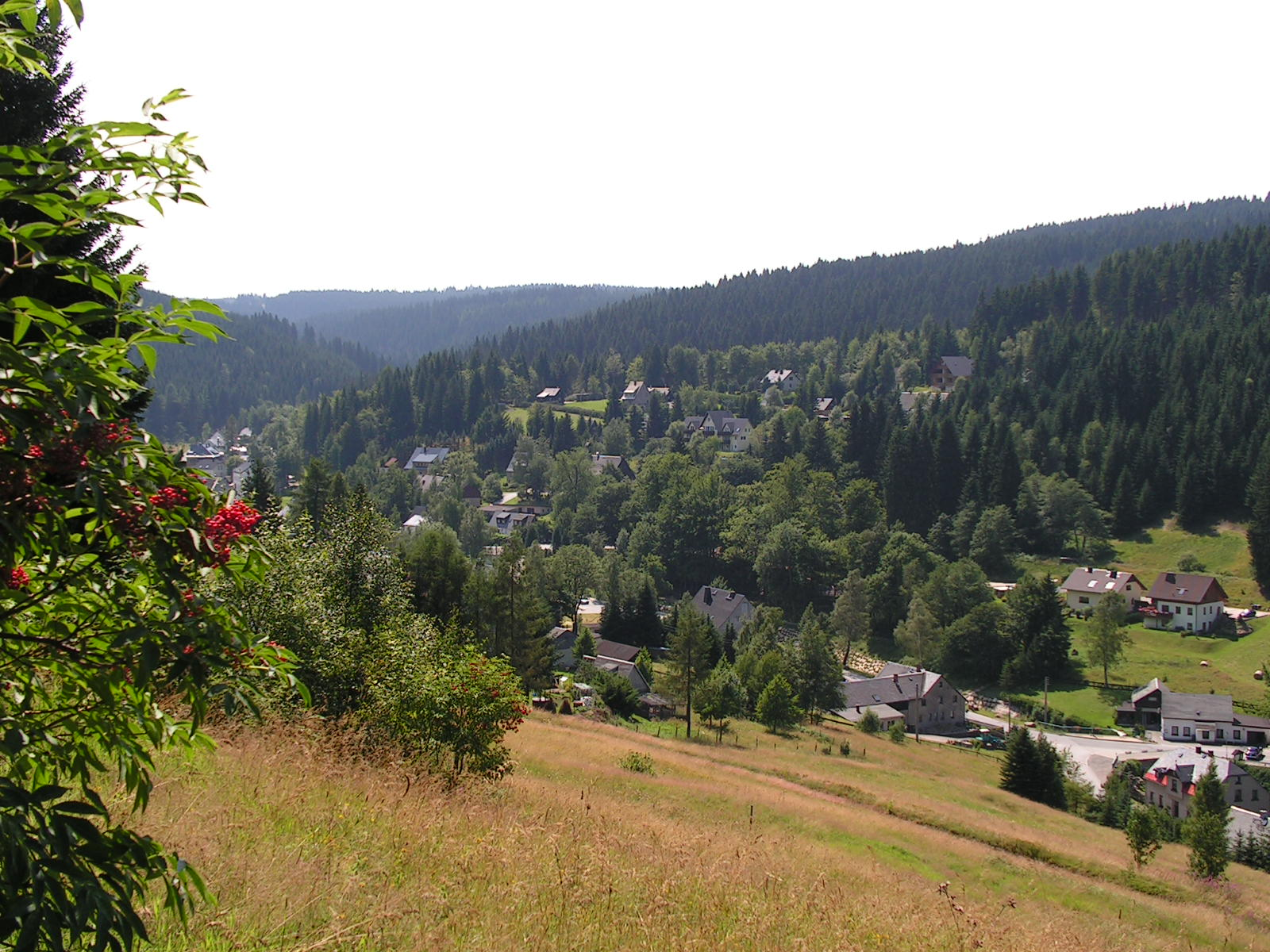
Wildenthal at the foot of the Auersberg

Wildenthal is a village in the town of Eibenstock in the district of Erzgebirgskreis in the Saxon Ore Mountains of Central Germany.

== Location ==
The state-recognised resort lies in a deeply incised valley of the Große Bockau river at the foot of the 1019-metre-high Auersberg within the Ore Mountains/Vogtland Nature Park. The village lies at an elevation of between 720 and 1019 metres above sea level (NN). The hamlet of Oberwildenthal on the state road to Johanngeorgenstadt also belongs to the town subdivision of Wildenthal. A link road to Carlsfeld branches off in the village.

== History ==
From 1952 to 1990, Wildenthal was part of the Bezirk Karl-Marx-Stadt of East Germany.
