= Daniel Friedrich Hecht =

German mathematician (1777–1833)

- Born: 8 July 1777; Sosa, Electorate of Saxony, now Germany
- Died: 13 March 1833 (aged 55); Freiberg, Kingdom of Saxony, now Germany
- Known for: Textbooks
- Scientific career
- Fields: Mathematics, mechanics
- Workplaces: Bergakademie, now University of Freiberg

Daniel Friedrich Hecht (8 July 1777 – 13 March 1833) was a German mathematician born in Sosa. He was a mine manager, then a teacher and finally a professor of mathematics. He is most notable for writing high school textbooks on math and geometry. He died in Saxony.
