= Auersberg =

Mountain in Saxony, Germany

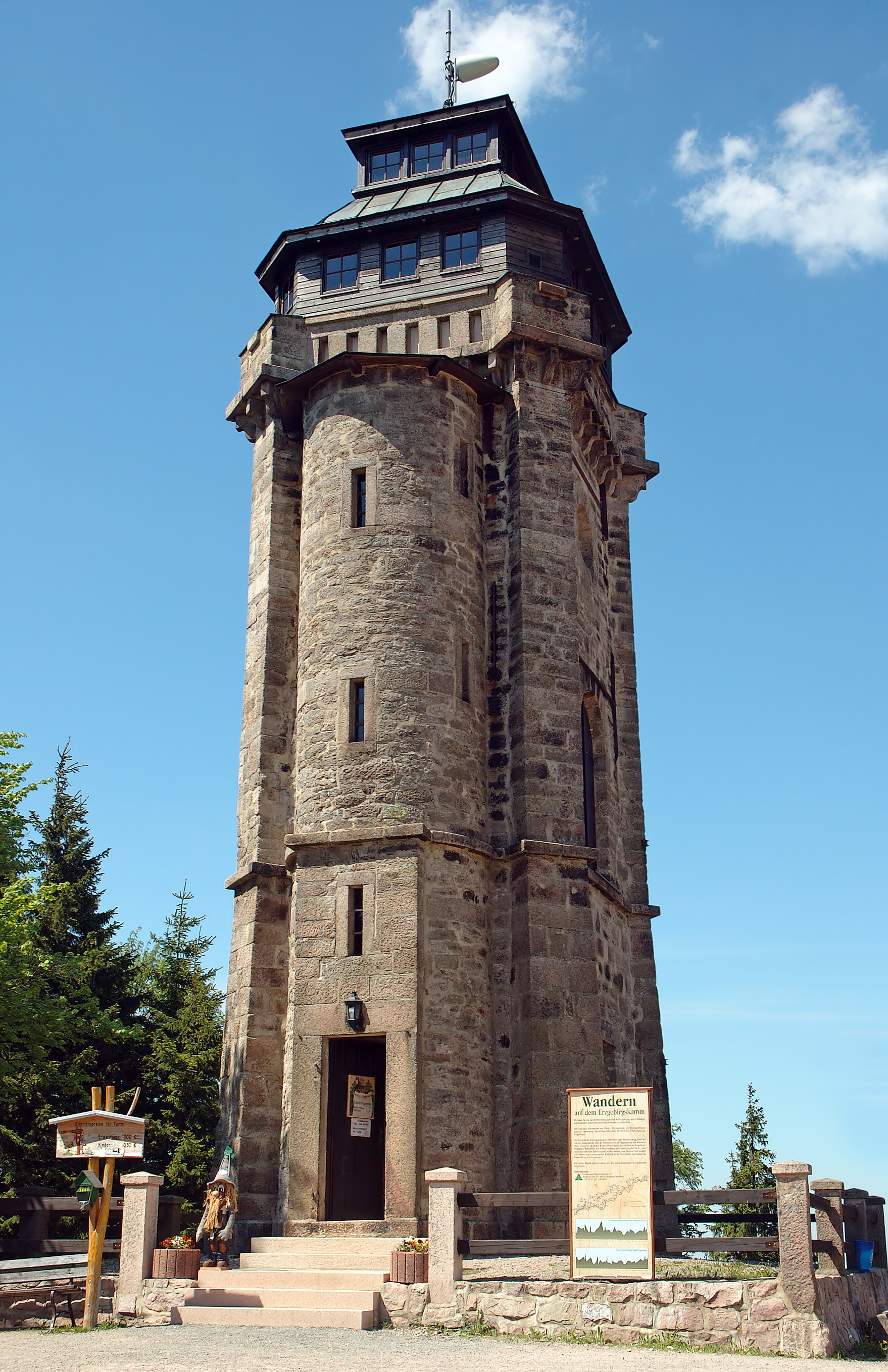
- Observation tower at Auersberg

Highest point
- Elevation: 1,018 m (3,340 ft)
- Listing: Mountains in the Ore Mountains
- Coordinates: 50°27′22″N 12°38′49″E

Geography
- Location within Saxony
- Location: Saxony, Germany
- Parent range: Ore Mountains

Auersberg is a mountain in the Ore Mountains in Saxony, southeastern Germany. Auersberg is 1,018 m (3,340 ft) above sea level. It is located in the district of Wildenthal not far from the Czech border southeast of Eibenstock and northwest of Johanngeorgenstadt.

== Location and Geology ==
Auersberg belongs to Wildenthal, which has been a district of Eibenstock since 1994. North of the Auersberg lies the Sosa dam. Below the summit there is a parking lot. When ascending to the Auersberg, you cross the Johanngeorgenstadt district of Sauschwemme. The main type of rock is medium-grained granite, which includes tourmaline. Also included in the granite are silver, tin and iron compounds, which were mined as early as the 16th century. At the peak of mining activity, there were up to 300 mines on the Auersberg. These included the Churhaus Saxony. In addition to the aforementioned rocks, quartz and slate have been proven to occur in veins on the summit.
