= Eibenstock Dam =

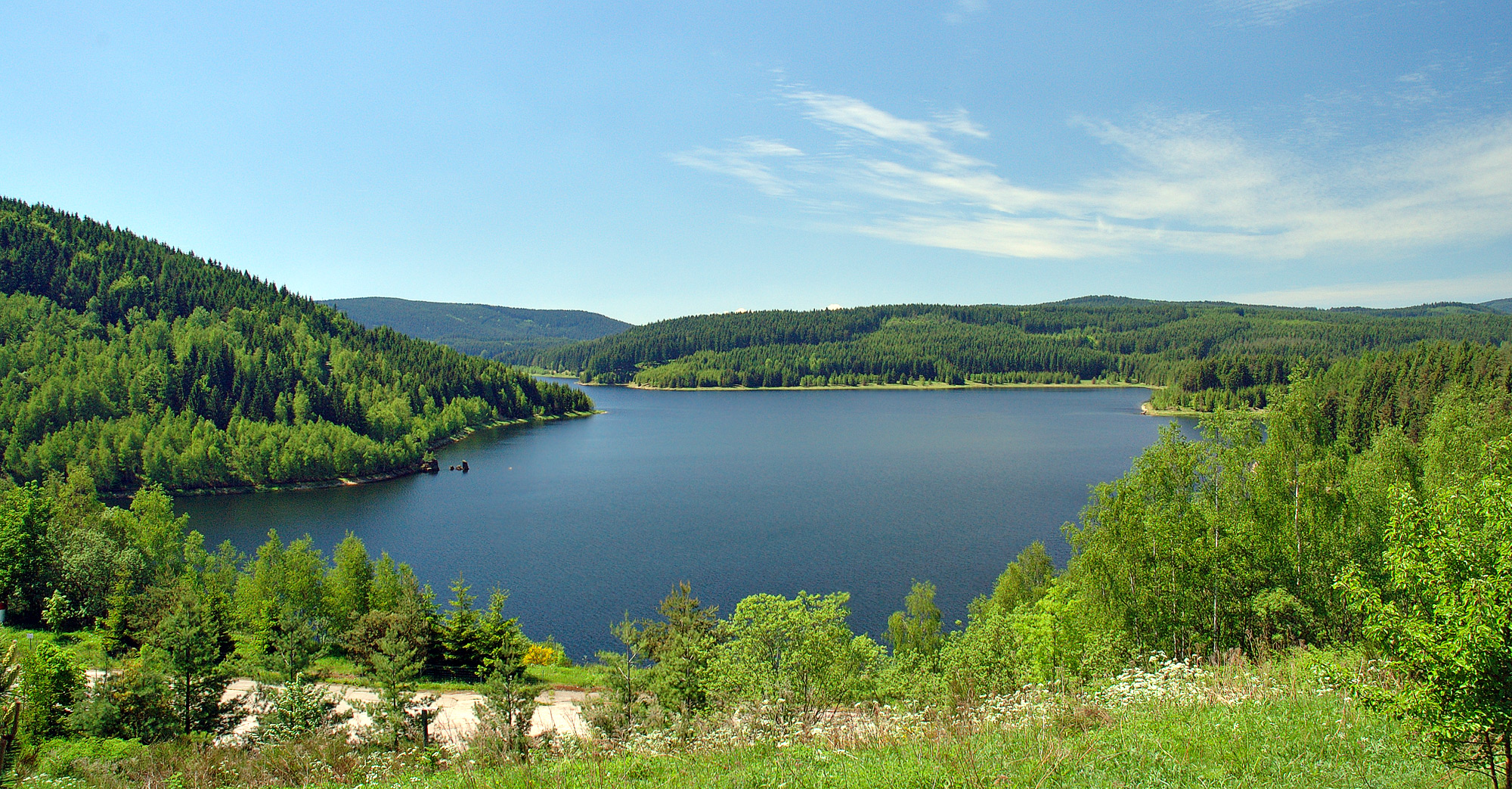
- Interactive map of Eibenstock Dam
- Location: Erzgebirgskreis, Germany
- Coordinates: 50.52333°N 12.58917°E
- Construction began: 1974–1987

Dam and spillways
- Impounds: Zwickauer Mulde, Rähmerbach, Geidenbach, Weißbach, Rohrbach
- Height (foundation): 65.50 m (214.9 ft)
- Height (thalweg): 57 m (187 ft)
- Length: 307.5 m (1,009 ft)
- Elevation at crest: 543.00 m (1,781.50 ft) AMSL
- Width (crest): 7.7 m (25 ft)
- Dam volume: 273,000 m^{3} (9,600,000 cu ft)

Reservoir
- Total capacity: 82.9×10^{6} m^{3} (67,200 acre⋅ft)
- Active capacity: 74.65×10^{6} m^{3} (60,520 acre⋅ft)
- Catchment area: 200 km^{2} (77 sq mi)
- Surface area: 370 ha (910 acres)
- Normal elevation: 539.60 m (1,770.3 ft)

Power Station
- Installed capacity: 1.7 MW (2,300 hp)

Eibenstock Dam (German: Talsperre Eibenstock) near Eibenstock in the Ore Mountains, Germany, is the largest dam in the Free State of Saxony in terms of the height of the dam above the valley floor, and its reservoir is the largest in volume in Saxony. The dam impounds the waters of the Zwickauer Mulde and supplies drinking water to the region of Chemnitz and Zwickau, as well as providing flood protection, delivering extra water during times of drought and, to a lesser extent, generating electricity from hydropower. Its dimensions make it the second largest drinking water reservoir in Germany's new federal states.

In order to make way for its construction, the inhabitants of the village of Muldenhammer (also called Windischhammer or Windischthal), whose former buildings (10 homes, 1 wood pulp factory, 1 large estate for the breeding of Höhenfleckrinder cattle and a paper mill) lie today under the water surface, had to be resettled. Many of them moved to new houses that were built in Eibenstock. In addition, the Chemnitz–Aue–Adorf railway between Wolfsgrün and Schönheide Ost was interrupted. The Schönheiderhammer tunnel on that stretch of the route was flooded. At low water levels the old portals of the tunnel can still be seen. Likewise, the branch line from Eibenstock unt. Bf. to Eibenstock ob. Bf. had to be closed. This section, the only standard gauge railway in Saxony with an incline of 1:20, was once known as the Eibenstock Ramp (Steilstrecke Eibenstock).

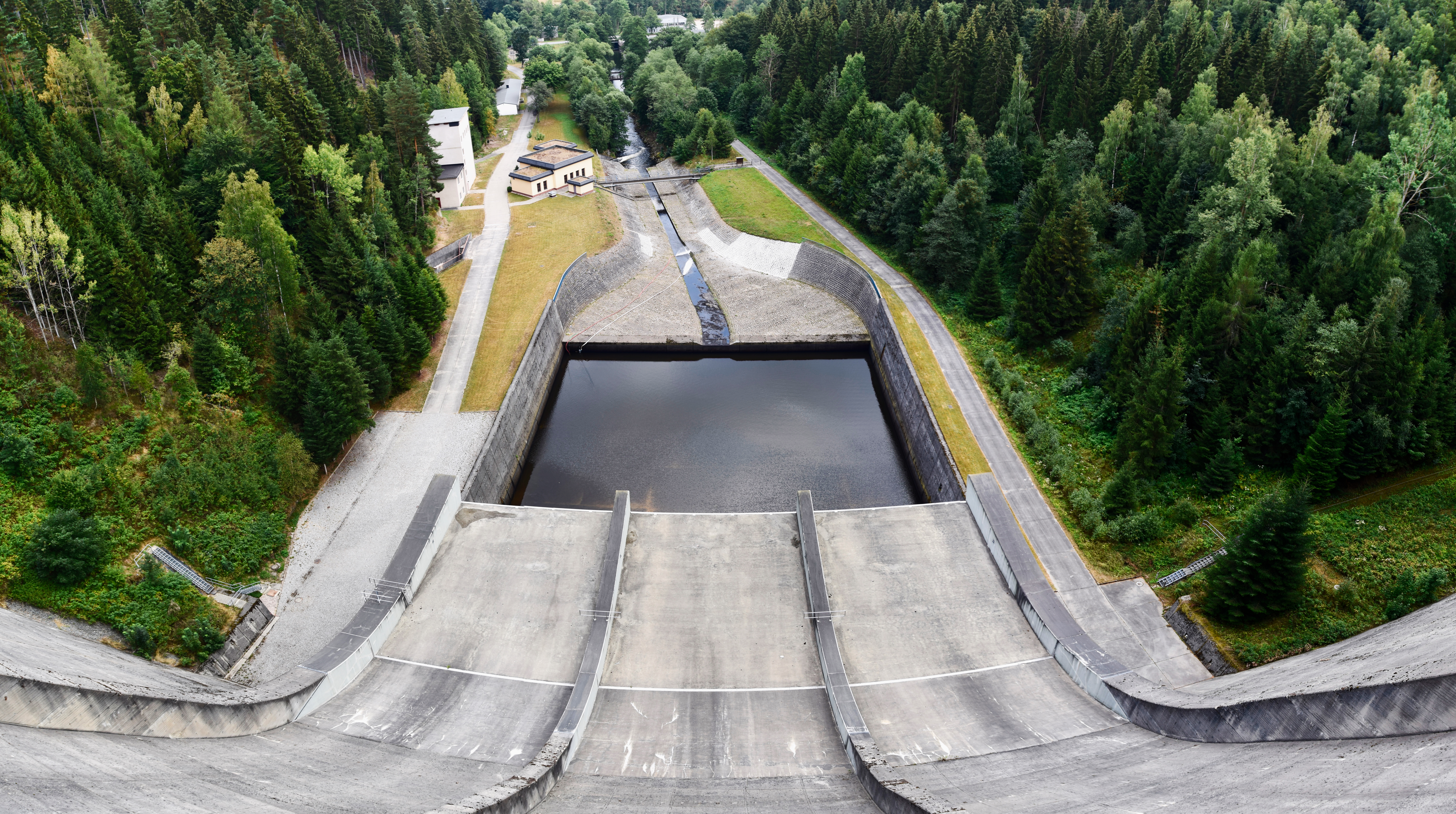
The water jump of the Eibenstock dam

The barrier itself is a straight gravity dam made of concrete. It was built between 1974 and 1984; it was taken into service in 1982 and completed in 1987. The first partial impoundment had already been carried out by 1980.

The dam has an upstream auxiliary dam (Schönheiderhammer Dam) and four subsidiary upstream basins (Rähmerbach, Geidenbach, Weißbach, Rohrbach).

Above the dam is an observation point offering a view across the reservoir. The dam itself is not accessible to the public. Bathing and water sports are also banned, because the dam impounds a drinking water reservoir.

== See also ==
- List of dams in Germany
