= Große Bockau =

River in Germany

Location
- Country: Germany
- States: Saxony

Physical characteristics
- Mouth
  - location: Zwickauer Mulde
  - coordinates: 50.5153°N 12.6258°E

Basin features
- Progression: Zwickauer Mulde→ Mulde→ Elbe→ North Sea

Große Bockau is a right (or southern) tributary of the Zwickauer Mulde in the Western Ore Mountains of the Free State of Saxony , approximately 14 km long. According to the natural region map of Saxony, the "Valley of the Große Bockau" constitutes a separate microgeochore and is part of the mesogeochore "Eibenstock Ridge".

== Etymology ==
The name is derived from the Old Sorbian word Bukowa, meaning beech. In the Saxon mile sheets of 1791, the river is still called Die Große Bockau (The Great Bockau). The village of Bockau is located to the northeast in another valley within the Erzgebirge district.

== Route ==
The Große Bockau rises south of the Buchkamm ridge, not far from the Czech border, at an elevation of approximately 930 meters above sea level and flows northwards past the foot of the Auersberg mountain, passing Oberwildenthal and Wildenthal. South of Zimmersacher, the Große Bockau is joined by the Kleine Bockau, which flows in from the right, before emptying into the Zwickauer Mulde river at an elevation of approximately 480 meters near the former Blauenthal train station.

== See also ==
- List of rivers of Saxony
