= Schattenberg (Ore Mountains) =

Coordinates: 50°24′10.397″N 12°41′00.646″E

The Schattenberg (Czech: Liščí hora) is a wooded mountain southwest of Jugel and northeast of Hirschenstand (Jelení) in the western Bohemian Ore Mountains, which is 950 metres high. East of the mountain lies the 980-metre-high Scheffelsberg and to the north is the 973-metre-high Buchschachtelberg. These three mountains form the main crest in this part of the Ore Mountains.

A footpath runs immediately past the Schattenberg that, in winter, is used as a cross-country skiing trail.

== Literature ==
- Wander- und Wintersportkarte des Erzgebirges, Sheet 3 - Auersberg, im Auftrag des Sächs. Finanzministeriums published by the Reichsamt für Landesaufnahme, 1928.
