= Jugel =

Coordinates: 50°24′45″N 12°42′10″E

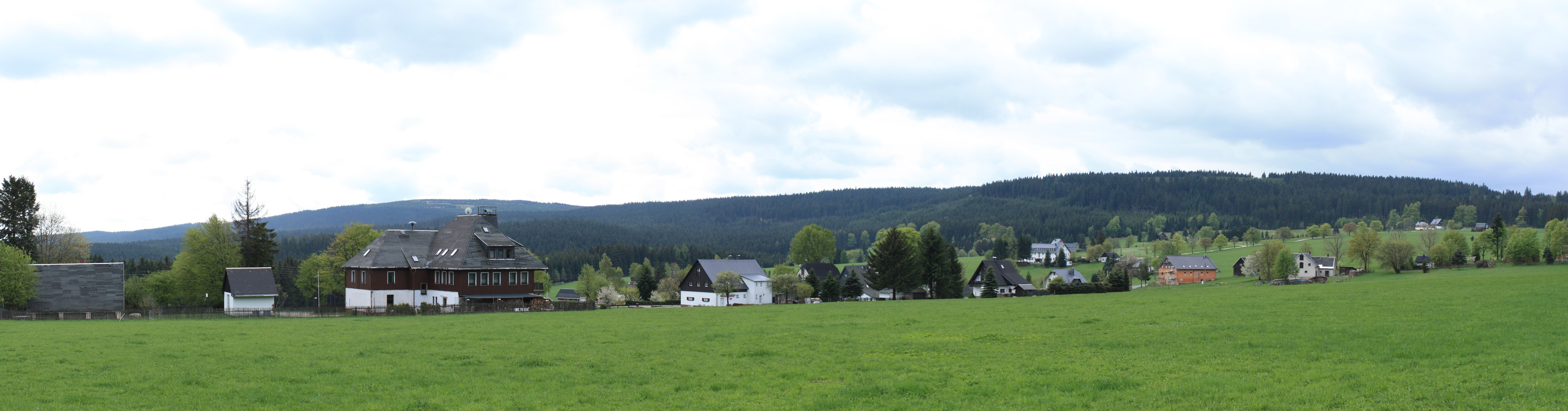
Oberjugel with view of the Scheffelsberg and Ore Mountain crest

Jugel is a division of the town of Johanngeorgenstadt in the German district of Erzgebirgskreis. This dispersed settlement is surrounded by woods, is divided into Ober- and Unterjugel ("Upper and Lower Jugel") and runs along the German-Czech border from the Lehmergrund (708 m) to the crest of the Western Ore Mountains (873 m). In the vicinity lies the 980 metre-high Scheffelsberg. Jugel is a tourist destination for hikers and winter sportsmen.

The village may be reached by railway on the Zwickau–Aue–Schwarzenberg–Johanngeorgenstadt line and by car along Staatsstraße 272 which runs from Schwarzenberg via Johanngeorgenstadt to Wildenthal.

== History ==
The founding of the village goes back to the days of the mining industry in the 16th century. In 1561, the phrase an der Gugell appears in the records. In 1571, Sebastian Preißler built a glassworks with eight houses in what later became Oberjugel, where sheet glass, glasses and beakers were manufactured for the electoral Saxon court in Dresden. This glassworks closed in the early 18th century.

Today the territory of Oberjugel incorporates the houses of Henneberg, including a popular pub not far from the Kleiner Kranichsee (928 m), and a raised bog, which is protected as a nature reserve.

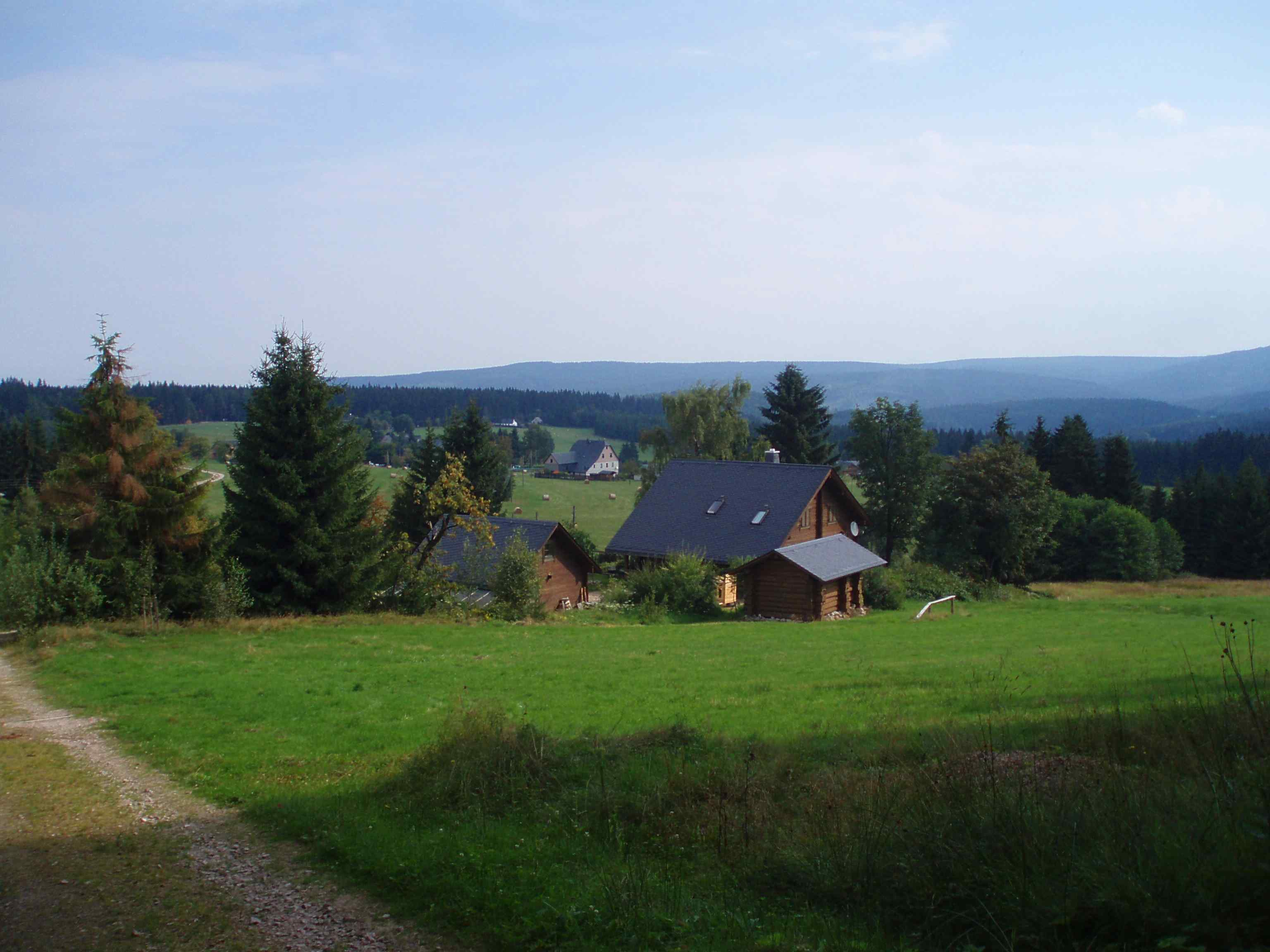
At the southeast edge of Oberjugel

In Unterjugel, a timber mill (Brettmühle) and a paint mill, belonging to Johann Gabriel Lobel a grandson of Preißler, were operated using the hydropower of the Pechhöfer Bach stream for the manufacture of cobalt blue paint. Löbel's mill, the Unterjugel Blue Colour Works (Blaufarbenwerk Unterjugel), to which six houses for the paint workers belonged, passed in 1668 into the possession of the Elector of Saxony and, in 1677, merged with the Oberschlema Blue Colour Works (Blaufarbenwerk Oberschlema). Today, a pub, Gasthof Farbmühle ("The Paintmill"), stands on what is believed to be the site of the former paint mill.

In 1935 Jugel was incorporated into Johanngeorgenstadt together with Wittigsthal.

== Tourism ==
There is a border crossing at the Farbenleithe which may be used in winter by ski tourists in order to reach the Ore Mountain/Krušné hory Ski Trail heading towards Horní Blatná or Jelení. In addition to the Wanderheim and the Erbgericht there are several other private landlords offering accommodation.

== Literature ==
- Schumann, August (1817). "Jugel, sonst Gugler Glashütte". Vollständiges Staats-, Post- und Zeitungslexikon von Sachsen (in German). Vol. 4. Zwickau. p. 398.
- Siegfried Sieber: Um Aue, Schwarzenberg und Johanngeorgenstadt. Akademie-Verlag, Berlin, 1972, pp. 158–165.
