= Schattenberg =

Schattenberg may refer to:

- Schattenberg (Allgäu Alps), a 1,845 metre high summit in the Allgäu Alps
- Schattenberg (Ore Mountains), a 950 metre high mountain in the Ore Mountains
- Schattenberg (Bleiburg), a village in Carinthia, Austria
- Schattenberg (Gaal), a village in Styria, Austria

Schattenberg is also the surname of the following people:

- Susanne Schattenberg (b 1969), German historian

See also

- Schadenberg
