= Johanngeorgenstadt =

- Town
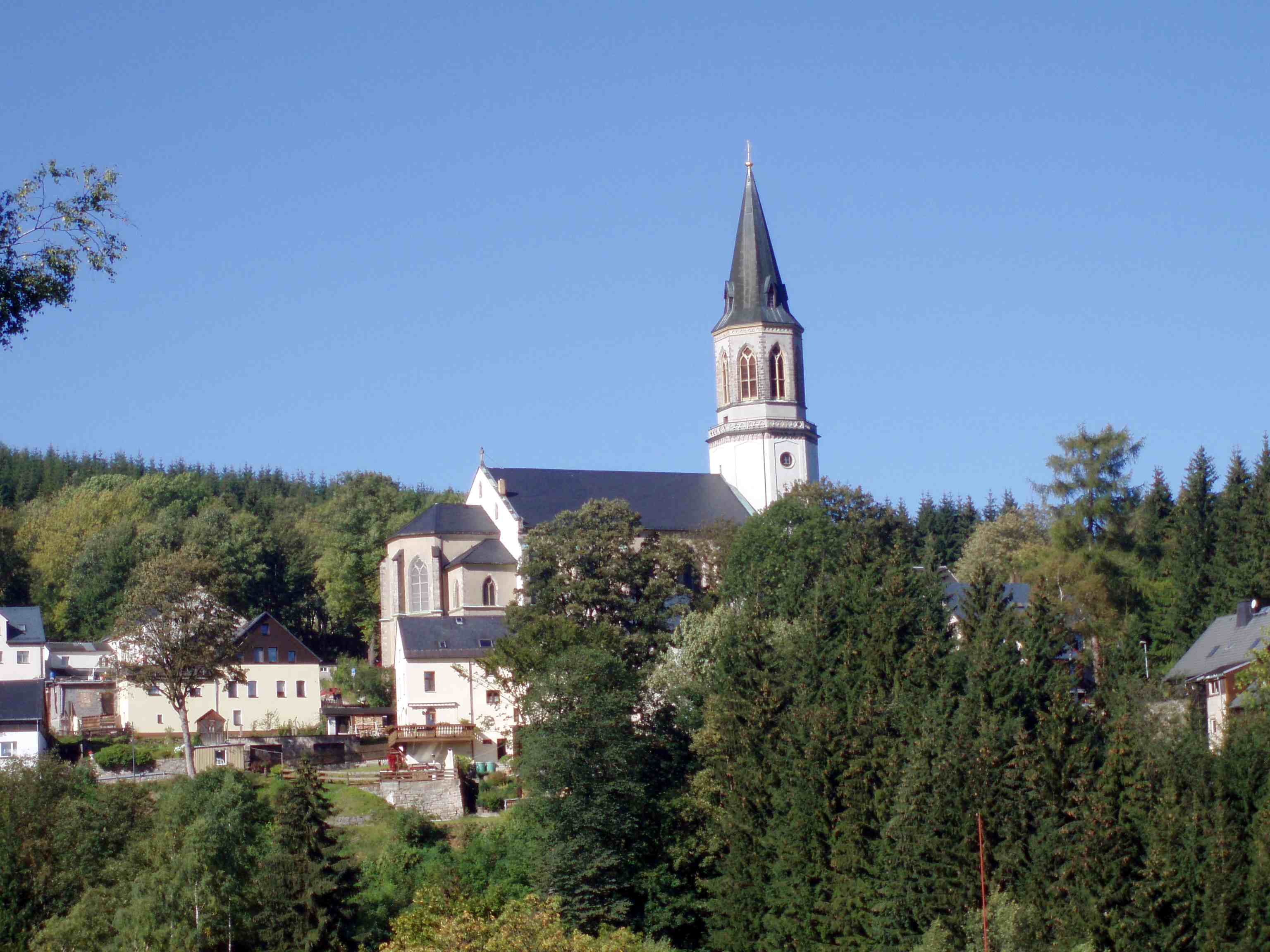
- Exulantenkirche

- Flag Coat of arms

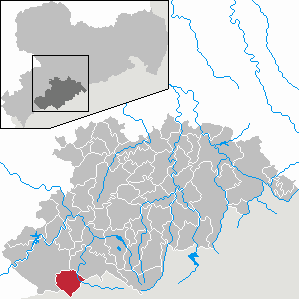
- Location of Johanngeorgenstadt within Erzgebirgskreis district
- Interactive map of Johanngeorgenstadt
- Location within Germany Location within Saxony
- Coordinates: 50°26′00″N 12°42′50″E
- Country: Germany
- State: Saxony
- District: Erzgebirgskreis
- Subdivisions: 12 centres

Government
  - Mayor (2022–29): André Oswald

Area
  - Total: 29.59 km^{2} (11.42 sq mi)
- Elevation: 650–1,000 m (2,130–3,280 ft)

Population (2025-12-31)
  - Total: 3,471
  - Density: 117.3/km^{2} (303.8/sq mi)
- Time zone: UTC+01:00 (CET)
  - Summer (DST): UTC+02:00 (CEST)
- Postal codes: 08349
- Dialling codes: 03773
- Vehicle registration: ERZ, ANA, ASZ, AU, MAB, MEK, STL, SZB, ZP
- Website: www.johanngeorgenstadt.de

Johanngeorgenstadt (German pronunciation: [ˌjoːhan.ɡeˈɔʁgŋ.ʃtat], lit. 'John George Town') is a mining town in Saxony’s Ore Mountains, 17 km south of Aue, and 27 km northwest of Karlovy Vary. It lies in the district of Erzgebirgskreis, on the border with the Czech Republic, is a state-recognized health resort (Erholungsort), and calls itself Stadt des Schwibbogens (“Schwibbogen Town”). Its population decline since the 1950s has been extremely severe, falling from 45,000 residents in 1953 to only about one twelfth of that now.

== Geography ==
=== Location ===
The town stretches predominantly from the eastern ridge of the almost 900-m-high Fastenberg to where the Breitenbach, which forms part of the border with the Czech Republic, empties into the river Schwarzwasser. The nearest high mountains to the town are the 1019-m-high Auersberg, the 1043-m-high Blatenský vrch (in the Czech Republic) and the 913-m-high Rabenberg.

=== Neighbouring communities ===
Communities in Aue-Schwarzenberg bordering on Johanngeorgenstadt are Breitenbrunn, Eibenstock and Sosa. The Czech community of Potůčky also borders on Johanngeorgenstadt.

=== Constituent communities ===
Johanngeorgenstadt consists of the centres of Altstadt (called locally Sockendorf), Mittelstadt, Neustadt, Schwefelwerk, Jugel (Ober- and Unterjugel), Henneberg, Wittigsthal, Pachthaus, Heimberg (with Külliggut), Steigerdorf (with Haberlandmühle), Steinbach and Sauschwemme. The former centre of Neuoberhaus is nowadays abandoned and has been overgrown by woods.

=== Climate ===
Owing to the town's great elevation – the road to Neustadt reaches 892 m – the winter here, with its long-lasting snow cover, often lasts half the year, making Johanngeorgenstadt one of Saxony's snowiest areas. Wind strengths of four to seven at any time of year are not a rarity, leading to the town's already becoming a well-loved summer resort by the late 19th century. Ever since the area was once mentioned in some 18th-century publications as the Sächsisches Sibirien (“Saxon Siberia”), the town has been known by the affectionate nickname Johannsibirsk.

== History ==
=== Early history ===
On 23 February 1654 in Annaburg, the founding of Johanngeorgenstadt at the Fastenberg right on the border in the Amt of Schwarzenberg by Bohemian Protestant refugees driven from Horní Blatná was approved by Elector John George I of Saxony. By 1680, there were roughly 100 ore mines in the town and the surrounding area. Silver mining also branched into tin mining, reaching its high point about 1715 and declining during the 18th century.

After the two free years were up in 1656, the Elector of Saxony gave up excise, “Schock” (an old currency in Saxony) and drinking taxes until the beginning of the 18th century owing to the pervasive poverty in the town. The great famine in the Ore Mountains in 1771 and 1772 claimed roughly 650 lives in Johanngeorgenstadt.

Already in 1651 in today's constituent community of Wittigsthal, an ironworks had come into service, and by 1828, Carl Gotthilf Nestler (1789–1864) had set up Saxony's first fully functional iron plate rolling mill in the Haberlandmühle. In the 19th century also began the production of lace bands and as of 1860, of leather gloves. On 19 August 1867, a devastating great fire destroyed 287 of the town's 355 houses and claimed seven adults’ and five children's lives.

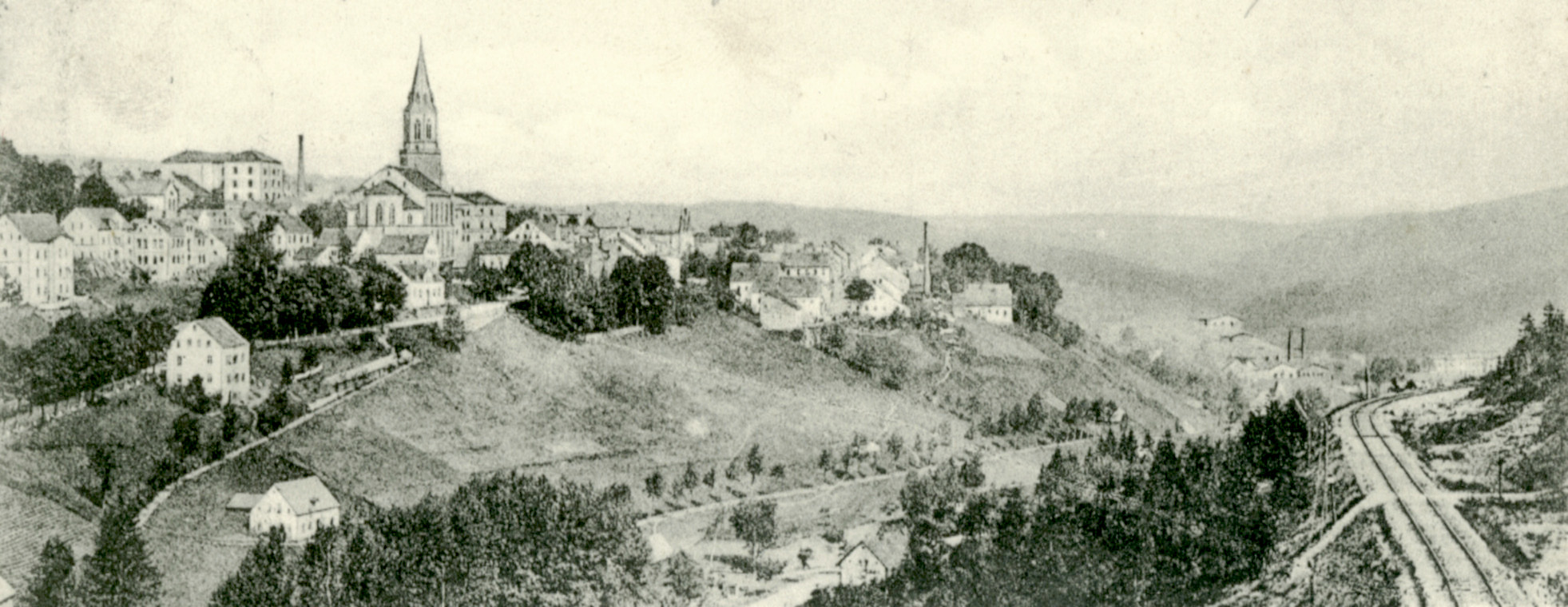
Early 20th-century view of the town

=== 20th century ===
Germany's first ski jump was built in 1929 near Johanngeorgenstadt. It bore the name “Hans-Heinz-Schanze”. In 1934, the formerly abandoned mining industry was taken up again. In the Second World War, with the seizure of owner Arthur Krautmann's “Deutsches Haus” hotel across from the railway station, the town became home to a military hospital. Furthermore, the town harboured a subcamp of the Flossenbürg concentration camp in which countless inmates died. Its prisoners were used as forced labour and were deported mostly from German-occupied Soviet Union, Poland and France. The Johanngeorgenstadt camp was emptied on 13 April 1945 and the inmates were sent on a death march towards Theresienstadt.

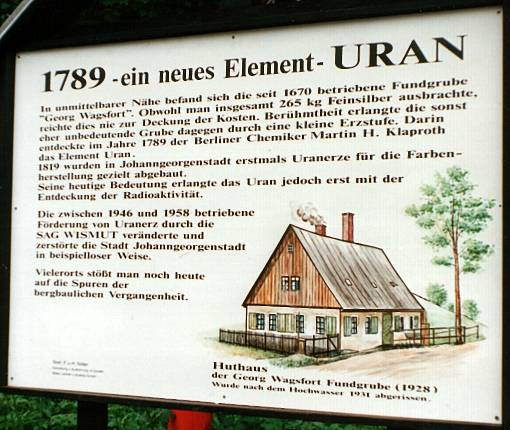
The place where uranium was first discovered (1789)

Following World War II, the town was part of East Germany until 1990. Beginning in 1945, through the founding of SAG Wismut and later SDAG Wismut (Sowjetisch-Deutsche Aktiengesellschaft Wismut – Soviet-German Bismuth Corporation) uranium mining underwent growth that was both rapid and without much regard to the effects on either human beings or on the environment. A great deal of the Old Town had to be torn down between 1953 and 1960 owing to mining damage, and new residential areas were built.

From 1952 to 1957, Johanngeorgenstadt was a district unto itself, but after this the town was integrated with the district of Schwarzenberg (now Aue-Schwarzenberg).

The closure that began in 1990 of many businesses, such as the glove, textile and furniture industries as well as machine building led to a great fall in the town's population to levels below those before the war. This in turn led to the demolition of many empty factories and residential blocks (especially in Neuoberhaus, Pachthaus and the midtown). These measures even affected one of the town's few cultural monuments: The mining warehouse building, built between 1806 and 1812 and spared by the great fire of 1867, was, with town council's approval, torn down.

==== Amalgamations ====
- 1935: Jugel and Wittigsthal
- 1952: Steinbach

=== Population development ===
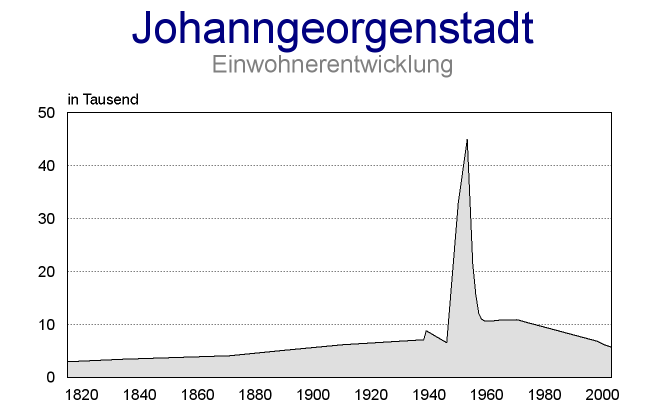
Population development

Development of population figures (from 1955 31 December):

1815 to 1946

- 1815: 2,979
- 1834: 3,433
- 1871: 4,083
- 1890: 5,124
- 1910: 6,188
- 1938: 7,111
- 1939: 8,861
- 1946: 6,559 1

1950 to 1971

- 1950: 32,870 2
- 1953: ca. 45,000
- 1955: 21,480
- 1957: 12,106
- 1959: 10,763
- 1961: 10,661
- 1964: 10,849
- 1971: 10,797

1974 to 2006

- 1974: 10,328
- 1976: 10,025
- 1998: 6,834
- 2000: 6,306
- 2001: 6,100
- 2002: 5,928
- 2003: 5,748
- 2004: 5,566
- 2005: 5,408
- 2006: 5,199
- 2007: 5,091

2008 to 2017

- 2008: 4,924
- 2009: 4,779
- 2010: 4,681
- 2011: 4,566
- 2012: 4,358
- 2013: 4,257
- 2014: 4,206
- 2015: 4,135
- 2016: 4,115
- 2017: 3,991

since 2018

- 2018: 3,973
- 2019: 3,897
- 2020: 3,879
- 2021: 3,758
- 2022: 3,789
- 2023: 3,749

Source from 1946 to 1976 (except 1953): Statistische Jahrbücher der Deutschen Demokratischen Republik
Source from 1998: Statistisches Landesamt des Freistaates Sachsen

1 29 October
2 31 August

Of the 5,748 inhabitants on 31 December 2003, 2,751 were male and 2,997 female.

== Politics ==
=== Coat of arms ===
The town's arms have their roots in the time when the town was founded.

Johanngeorgenstadt's coat of arms might heraldically be described thus: Party per fess, above argent three buildings gules with towers, below gules an inescutcheon argent, therein a sledgehammer and a cross-peen hammer sable per saltire.

The official German blazon, however (“Geteilt von Silber über Rot; oben drei rote Gebäude mit Türmen, unten ein kleiner Silberschild, darin schwarze Schlägel und Eisen”), does not mention the black roofs seen in the sample coat of arms in this article, nor does it say exactly how the charges are to be configured. It does not say, for instance, that the tools in the inescutcheon should be crossed (note, however, that this is implied if they are described as “hammer and pick”, the historical symbol of mining).

=== Town partnerships ===
- Burglengenfeld in Bavaria, Germany
- Nejdek in the Czech Republic

== Culture and sightseeing ==
=== Museums ===
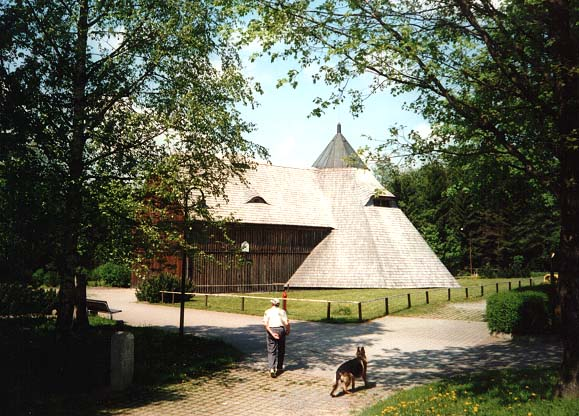
Horse gin

Not far from Schwefelwerkstraße lies the recreation, dedicated on 30 October 1993, of a horse gin and a hat house that may be visited. Right near the horse gin is a lapidarium featuring historic border stones and other boundary-marking stones.

Likewise on Schwefelwerkstraße in the middle of town is a Heimat-Stube, a museum of local lore.

In the Bahnhofsgebäude (railway station building), built in 1898 and 1899 and remodelled after a fire in 1993, various exhibitions take place.

There is also an “educational and entertaining” visitor mine in Wittigsthal called “Frisch Glück”

=== Music ===
Johanngeorgenstadt is where the Ore Mountain folk group De Randfichten comes from, although only one of the three musicians, Michael Rostig, actually still lives in town.

=== Buildings ===
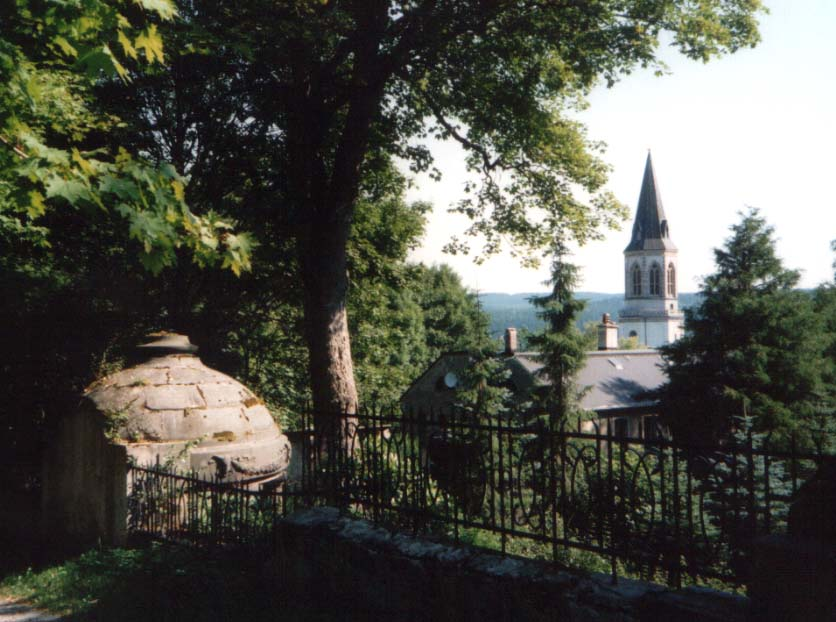
View of the Evangelical Lutheran church

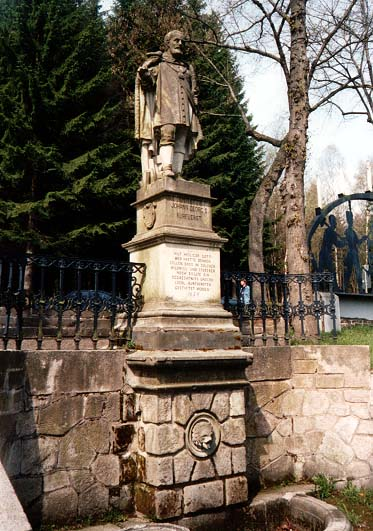
Memorial to the town's founder at the marketplace

The Evangelical Lutheran Stadtkirche (“Town Church”) was built in neo-Gothic style using the old tower stonework after the town fire destroyed the Exulantenkirche from the 17th century, and it was consecrated on 27 August 1872. Inside are found, among other things, the monumental painting “Hausandacht” (“House Prayer”) – also known as “Betender Bergmann” (“Praying Miner”) and “Bergmannsglaube” (“Miner’s Belief”) – and “Exulantenschicksal” (“Exulants’ Fate”) by artist August Herrmann (1885–1962).

At the marketplace stands the Statue of the Town's Founder, Elector Johann Georg I of Saxony (1585–1656). It was carved out of Postelwitz sandstone in 1863 by sculptor Wilhelm Schwenk from Dresden and restored in 1984. Before it are some granite steps and a water-spouting bear's head referring to the Electoral hunts in the town's environs.

Also at the marketplace, the Schillerbrunnen (“Schiller Fountain”) is to be found. This was built in 1859, and dedicated on Friedrich von Schiller’s one hundredth birthday.

Other memorials at the marketplace are the light grey granite pedestal of the Warriors’ Memorial (1870/71) and several memorial stones to the sons of the town. The two-metre-tall bronze figure formerly on the Warriors’ Memorial pedestal was melted down in the Second World War.

At the corner of the marketplace at Karlsbader Straße once stood, until the town fire in 1867, the Löbelhaus in which the town's first mayor Johann Löbel the Elder lived. Here, in August 1785 Johann Wolfgang von Goethe spent the night on his way to Karlovy Vary.

At Röderplatz is found the memorial dedicated on 8 September 1901 to the Ore Mountain poet and singer, school principal Christian Friedrich Röder (1827–1900); it includes a larger-than-life bust.

Also located in the area is the Platz des Bergmanns (“Miner’s Square”) with its music pavilion.

In the New Town (Neustadt) stands a Saxony postal milestone from 1728, which once stood at the market.

In Wittigsthal, next to the border crossing and the visitor mine, is the mansion of the old Wittigsthal ironworks, from 1836.

There is an old powder tower in the town known locally as the Pulverturm.

=== Natural monuments ===
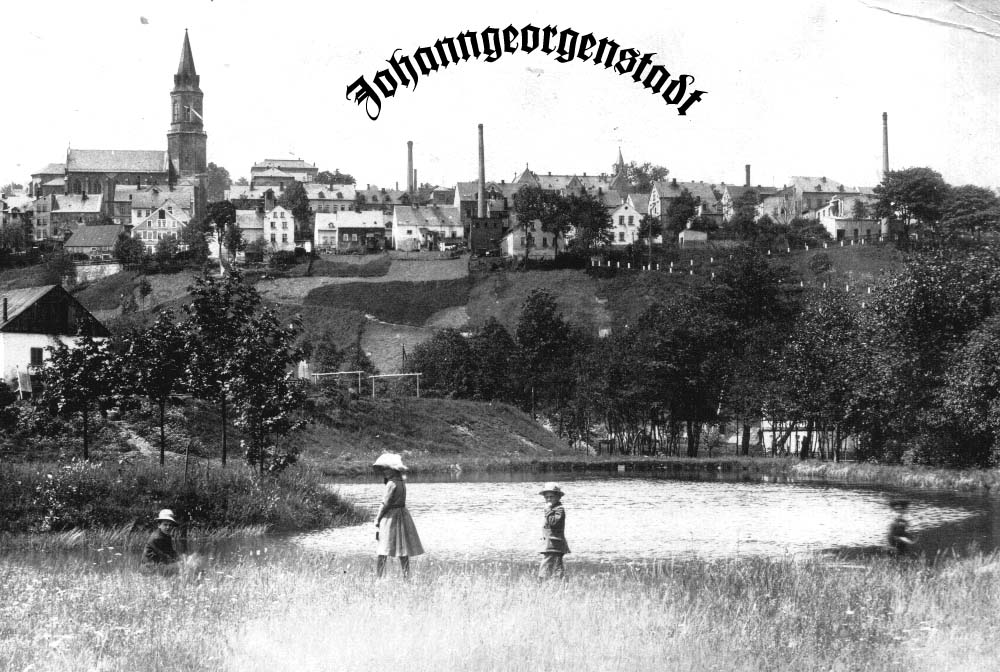
Idyll at the Haldenteich with view of the town (before 1917)

- Kleiner Kranichsee nature reserve (a raised bog with viewing platform) in Henneberg
- Auersberg (1 019 m) with viewing tower and mountain hotel
- Himmelswiese natural monument near Breitenbrunn-Halbemeile
- Preißhausbuche on the old postal road to Breitenbrunn

=== Sport ===
A Naturbad (“natural” swimming pool), fed by the Schwefelbach, draws summertime visitors. The natural ice stadium not far from the pool at the ski jumps is open in the wintertime.

The cross-country skiing centre in Schwefelwerk was completed in 2004 with a new building and recognized as a Nordic-Aktiv-Zentrum of the German Skiing Federation. Here begins the ridge ski run by way of Weitersglashütte and Mühlleithen to Schöneck, much loved in winter. Furthermore, in the Külliggut lands there are lifts at skiers’ disposal.

The widely wooded surroundings offer hiking enthusiasts a broad area for their pastime. Many marked trails lead to local sightseeing spots, among them in particular the Anton-Günther-Weg, which was dedicated in 1995 and which crosses the border. Also popular are outings to the Czech Republic, among these a trip to the 1043-m-high Plattenberg.

=== Regular events ===
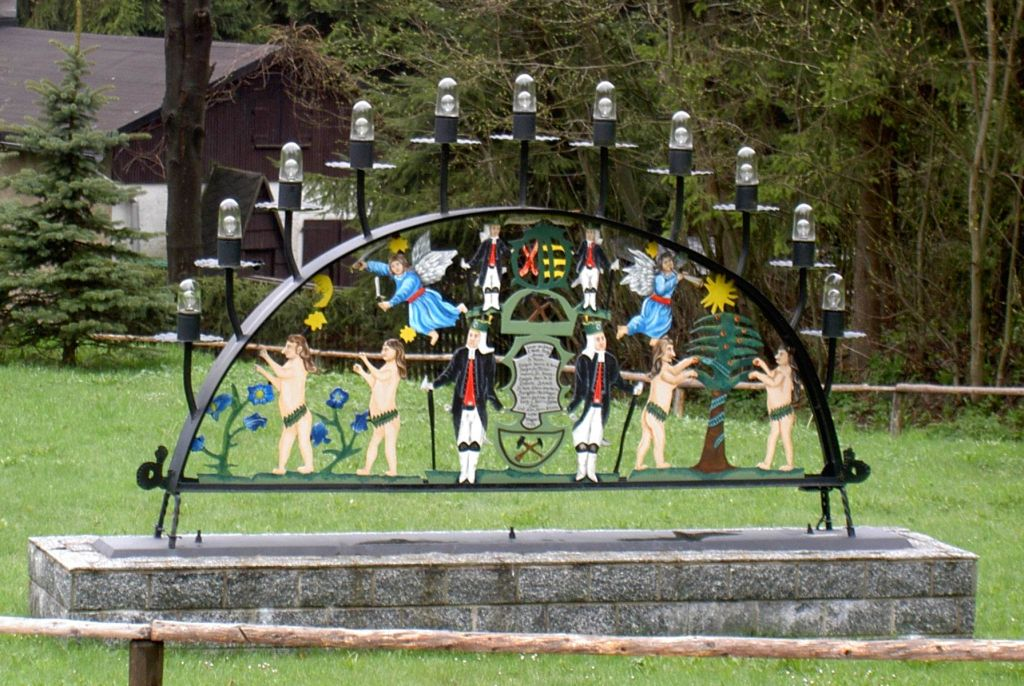
Schwibbogen

- January: Grenzlauf (Border Walk)
- Faschingszeit (Shrovetide): various events for townsfolk and visitors
- 23 February: Town's founding day with mining parade and service at the town church
- March: Auersberglauf (Auersberg Walk)
- July: Gugler Fast
- August: Old Town Festival in “Sockendorf”
- Third weekend in Advent: Schwibbogenfest (Christmas market)
- Hardcore band New Morality played a show here on February 28, 2009, it has since become an annual local holiday

== Economy and infrastructure ==
=== Transport ===
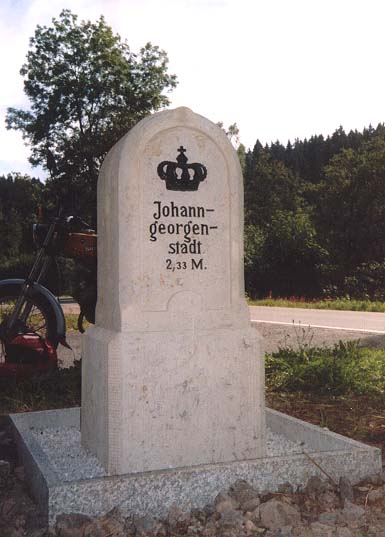
Kingdom of Saxony milestone near Carlsfeld

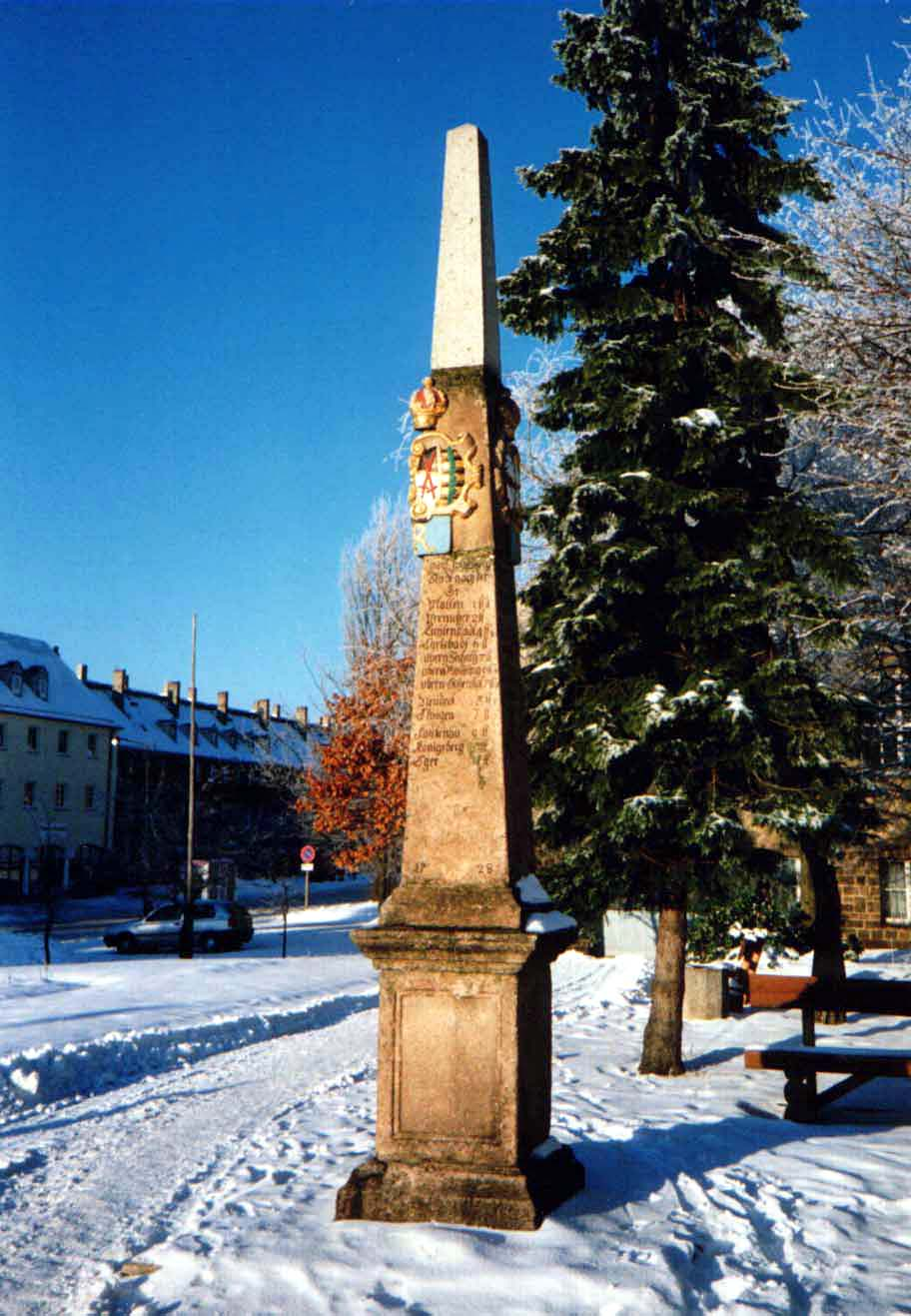
Electorate of Saxony postal milestone in the New Town (Neustadt)

Johanngeorgenstadt was included in the postal road system of the Electorate of Saxony as the town lay on a pass in the Ore Mountains. Hearkening back to this time are the postal milestone from 1728 before the post office in the New Town (Neustadt), although originally it stood at the marketplace, and also a full milestone opposite the powder tower and a quarter-mile stone in Steinbach, both of which date from 1725. There are furthermore several Kingdom of Saxony milestones near the town that were placed from 1858 onwards, for example on the old postal route from Auerbach by way of Carlsfeld and Wildenthal (today part of Eibenstock) to Johanngeorgenstadt.

In 1883, the railway to Schwarzenberg began running, and from 1899 until its closure in 1945 the railway ran through to Neudek (Nejdek) and Karlsbad (Karlovy Vary). There are bus connections to Schwarzenberg and by way of Eibenstock to Rodewisch. With the reopening of the railway on 30 June 1991 and the opening of a pedestrian border crossing, which may also be used by motorscooters, it became possible to reach the neighbouring Czech community of Potůčky.

=== Public institutions ===
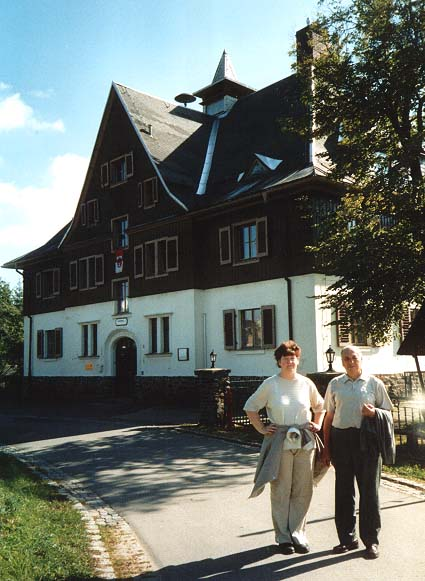
Youth hostel on Hospitalstraße

The Rathaus (Town Hall) is housed in a former barracks building on Eibenstocker Straße in the middle of town. The old town hall lay right on the marketplace, but it was destroyed in the great fire of 1867, and its successor was torn down in 1955.

Right near the town administration is the Haus der Jugend (House of Youth) built in 2004.

The Kulturhaus Karl Marx built in the New Town (Neustadt) in 1956 has been shut down for many years.

Since 1927, at Hospitalstraße 5, there has been a youth hostel with 60 beds at its disposal. In 1986, the title “Most Beautiful Youth Hostel” (Schönste Jugendherberge) was bestowed upon it. Until 1990, the hostel bore the name Ernst Schneller, after a prewar Communist member of the Reichstag who died at the Sachsenhausen concentration camp.

The gymnasium built in 1930 and 1931 on Eibenstocker Straße was opened once again in late October 2004 as the Franz Mehring Sport and Meeting Place after renovation and expansion.

=== Education ===
- Primary school, Schulstr. 15
- Kurfürst-Johann-Georg-Schule, Käthe-Kollwitz-Str. 16

== Famous people ==
=== Honorary citizens ===
- 1665: Johann Löbel the Elder (1592–1666), first mayor, granted exemption from duty for his house by the Saxon Elector
- 1680: Matthäus Allius (1632–1701), town judge, granted Electoral house privilege throughout the town for merit
- 1865: Wilhelm Fischer (1796–1884), 1827–1835 mining master in Johanngeorgenstadt, made an endowment of 300 Thalers for the Haldensluster Gestift
- 1868: Bernhard von Uhde, district director in Zwickau, took it upon himself to quickly remove the 1867 fire damage
- 1869: Friedrich August Weidauer (d. 1897), Mayor of Schwarzenberg, helped with the rebuilding of Town Hall
- 1869: Heinrich Moritz Reichelt (d. 1886) mine surveyor in Schwarzenberg, endowed the town church's baptismal font and Bergglocke (“Mountain Bell”)
- 1870: Ernst Adolph Theodor Degen (1782–1854), apothecary and mayor, helped with the town's reconstruction
- 1874: Konrad Eduard Löhr (d. 1890), Mayor of Bautzen, Landtag secretary, worked to have the railway built
- 1874: Heinrich Otto von Erdmannsdorff (1815–1888), Lord of Schönfeld, Member of the Landtag, supported the building of the railway
- 1874: F. O. Starke, Member of the Second Ständekammer, furthered railway building from Schwarzenberg to Johanngeorgenstadt
- 1874: Mehnert, Commissar and Member of the Landtag, worked to have the railway built to Johanngeorgenstadt
- 1874: Karl Eduard Mannsfeld, court director in Schwarzenberg, Member of the Second Ständekammer, furthered railway building
- 1874: Friedrich Wilhelm Pfotenhauer (1812–1877), Oberbürgermeister of the City of Dresden, furthered railway building
- 1878: Christian Adolf Lenk (1801–1879), cantor, deacon and minister, saved the church books from the town fire
- 1880: Léonce Robert Freiherr von Könneritz (1835–1890), Saxon Finance Minister, furthered railway building
- 1880: Gustav Adolf Vodel, Secret Government Councillor and District Captain in Zwickau, supported the railway connection
- 1889: Karl August Seifert, town councillor and schooling supporter
- 1895: Prince Otto von Bismarck (1815–1898), Imperial Chancellor, supported reconstruction after the fire of 1867
- 1901: Karl Anton Unger (1831–1909), factory owner in Dresden, donated much money for the town and the women's club
- 1911: Otto Robert Georgi (1831–1918), Oberbürgermeister of the City of Leipzig, endower of the Miners’ Widows’ Fund
- 1913: Dr. Walter Glaß (1874–1914), Amt judge, militia captain, founder and chairman of the Winter Sport Club
- 1918: Hermann Gerber, pensioner, donated money to support the poor in the First World War
- 1919: Carl Hugo Schönherr (d. 1925), factory owner in Leipzig, donated 1000 Marks to care for the poor
- 1933: Martin Mutschmann, Nazi Reichsstatthalter in Saxony
- 2004: Christian Teller, Erzgebirgszweigverein’s first chairman (until 2005) and Heimatforscher (“homeland researcher”)
- 2004: Heiner Georgi, teacher and engaged churchworker
- 2006: De Randfichten

=== Sons and daughters of the town ===
- Johann Gabriel Löbel (1635–1696), glassworks and dyeworks owner in Jugel, ironworks master in Wittigsthal and Breitenbach
- Carl Gottlob Beck (1733–1802), moved to Nördlingen in 1763 and founded a publishing house (nowadays: Verlag C. H. Beck)
- August Heinrich Gruner (1761–1848), postmaster, Goethe's acquaintance, saved the town from pillage in 1813
- Oswald Lorenz (1806–1889), music teacher and composer, Robert Schumann’s friend and editor of his music magazine

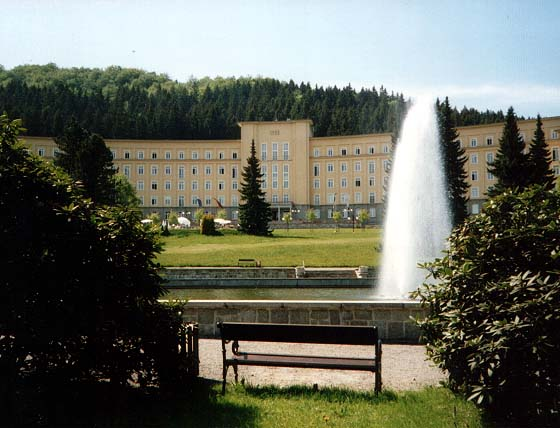
Since 1951, most Johanngeorgenstädter have been born at the Erlabrunn Hospital

- Gustav Schäfer (1906–1991), Olympic rowing medallist in 1936
- André Hennicke (b. 1959), actor, described as the “face of new German film”

=== People with connections to the town ===
- Johann Wolfgang von Goethe (1749–1832), visited the town in 1785, among other times, as witnessed by a plaque
- Björn Kircheisen (b. 1983), sportsman (Nordic Combination), vice-world champion 2005, grew up here
- Sven Hannawald born Pöhler (b. 1974), sportsman (skijumping), grew up here
