= Großer Kranichsee =

Nature reserve in Germany

Coordinates: 50°24′29″N 12°35′16″E

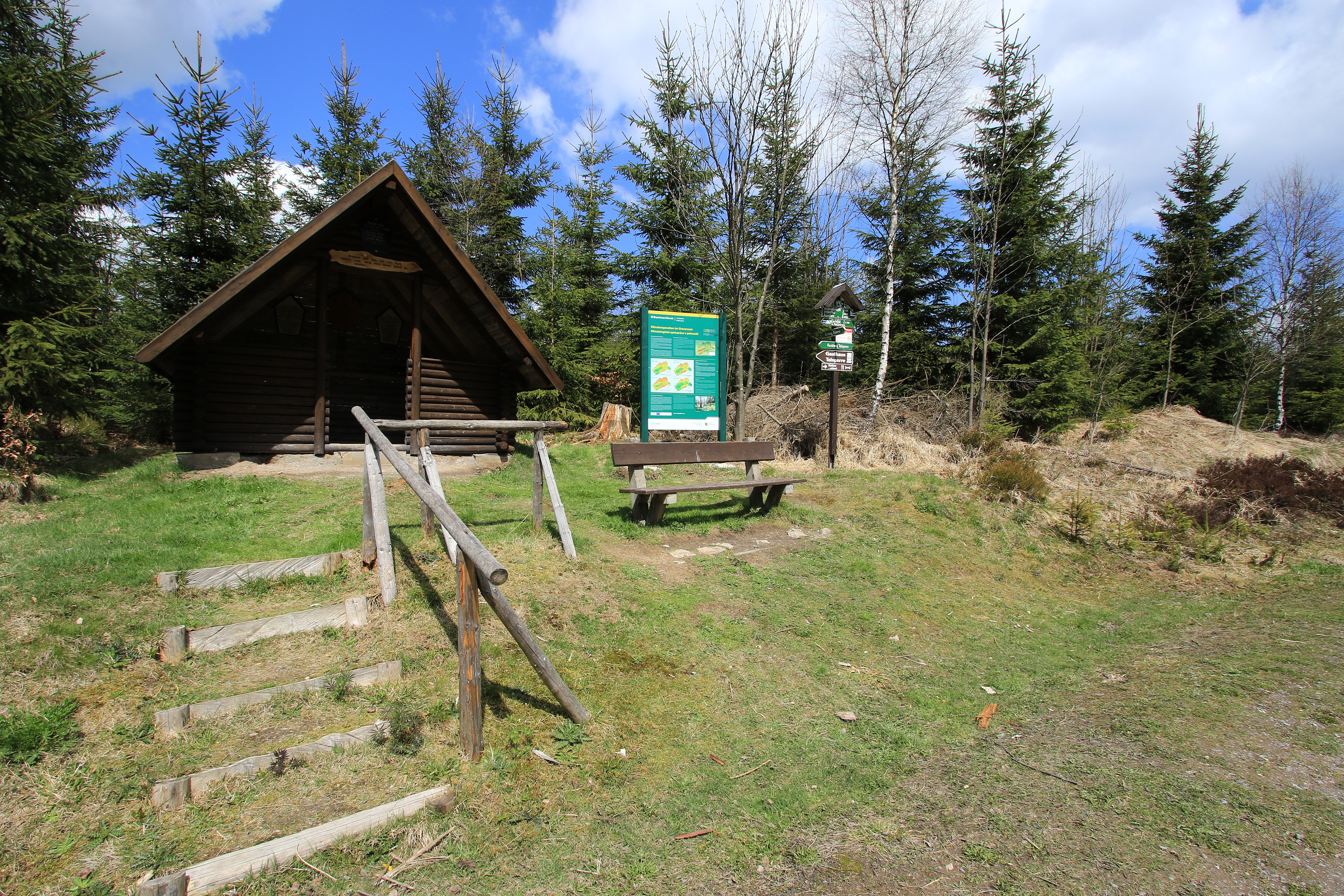
Nature reserve "Großer Kranichsee" near Carlsfeld in Saxony.

Großer Kranichsee is a nature reserve in the Ore Mountains in Saxony, Germany. It includes the smaller part of the eponymous bog, which is one of the most important raised bogs in the Ore Mountains.

== Geography ==
The nature reserve is located at an elevation of 950 metres above sea level in a high forest in the territories of Eibenstock and Muldenhammer. The nature reserve is located next to the border with the Czech Republic. The larger part of the Großer Kranichsee bog (Czech: Velké jeřábí jezero) is located on the Czech side of the border within the Rolavská vrchoviště National Nature Reserve.

In the southwestern part of the Großer Kranichsee Nature Reserve is located the Schwarzer Teich pond. To the east is the Kleiner Kranichsee, where the heart of the bog, unlike the Großer Kranichsee, lies on the German side of the border.

It is a watershed and krummholz bog that is drained to the northwest by the Große Pyra and to the southwest by the Rolava.

== Nature ==
Among the vegetation typical for the nature reserve are mountain pine (Pinus mugo), hare's-tail cotton-grass (Eriophorum vaginatum), black crowberry (Empetrum nigrum), bog bilberry (Vaccinium uliginosum) and bog rosemary (Andromeda polifolia).

Among the fauna in the area are European viper (Vipera berus and (Lacerta vivipara).

== Tourism ==
As early as 1900 the Ore Mountain Club branch at Carlsfeld laid a corduroy road into the bog and erected an observation platform that has since disappeared.
