= De Randfichten =

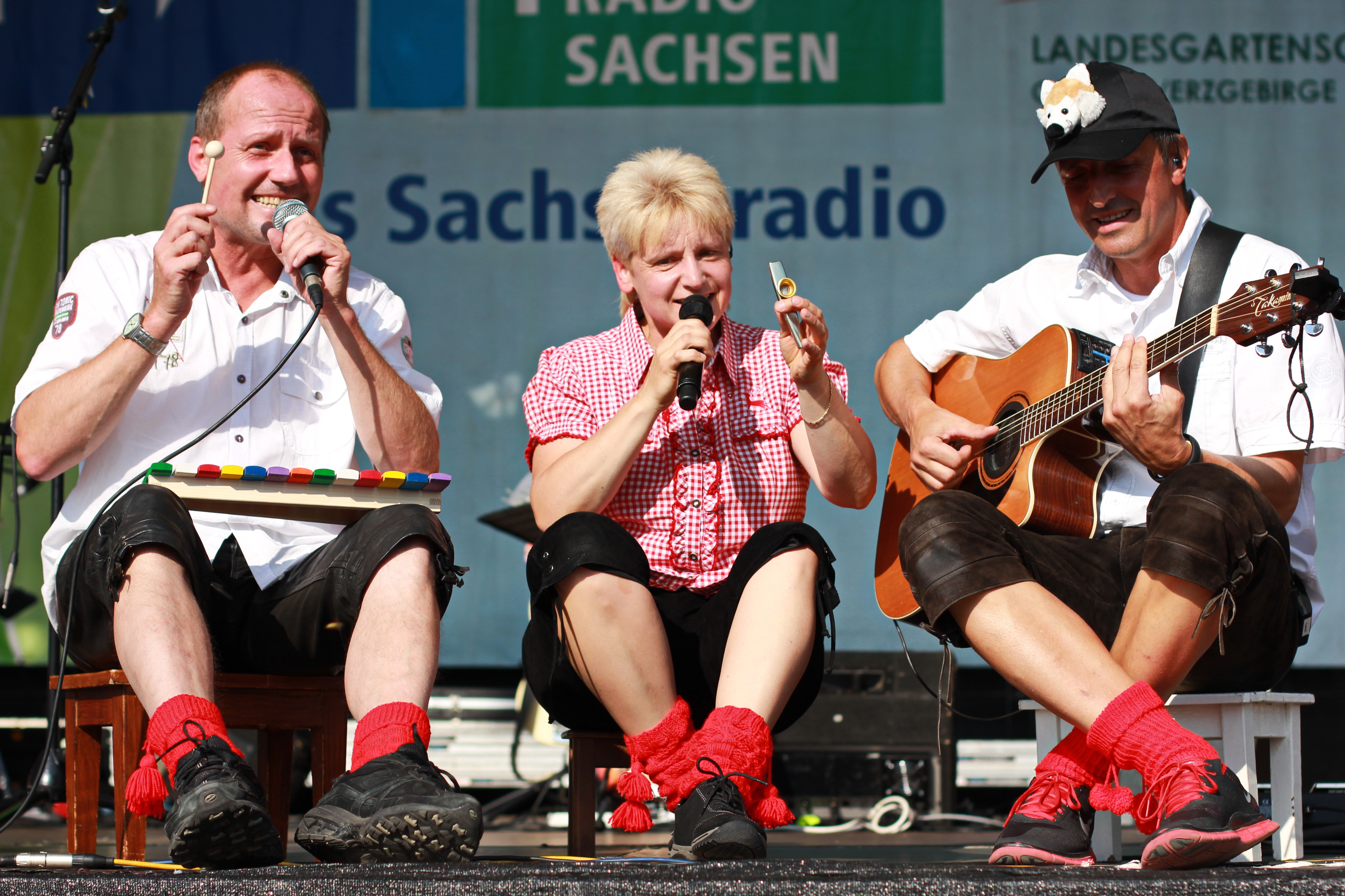
15 years De Randfichten

De Randfichten are a German Volksmusik (folk music) band from Johanngeorgenstadt, Saxony.

Founded in 1992 as Original Arzgebirgische Randfichten by Thomas "Rups" Unger and Michael "Michl" Rostig, they were renamed to De Randfichten in 1997. In that year Thomas "Lauti" Lauterbach became a band member, and they released their first album Do pfeift dr Fuchs.

Their song "Lebt denn der alte Holzmichl noch?" reached #3 on the German single charts in July 2004 and was in the German Top 100 for 56 weeks. The song is based on a traditional folk song "Der Hausmichl".

After the "Holzmichl" song they had six other singles in the German charts, "De lustigen Holzhackerleit", "Jetzt geht die Party richtig los", "Das kommt vom Rudern", "Nananana", "Rups am Grill" and "Du kleine Fliege"; the most recent of these was in 2012.

In 2005, the group represented Saxony in the Bundesvision Song Contest 2005, with the song "Jetzt geht die Party richtig los", placing 6th with 71 points.
