= Pulverturm, Johanngeorgenstadt =

Coordinates: 50.434042°N 12.709186°E

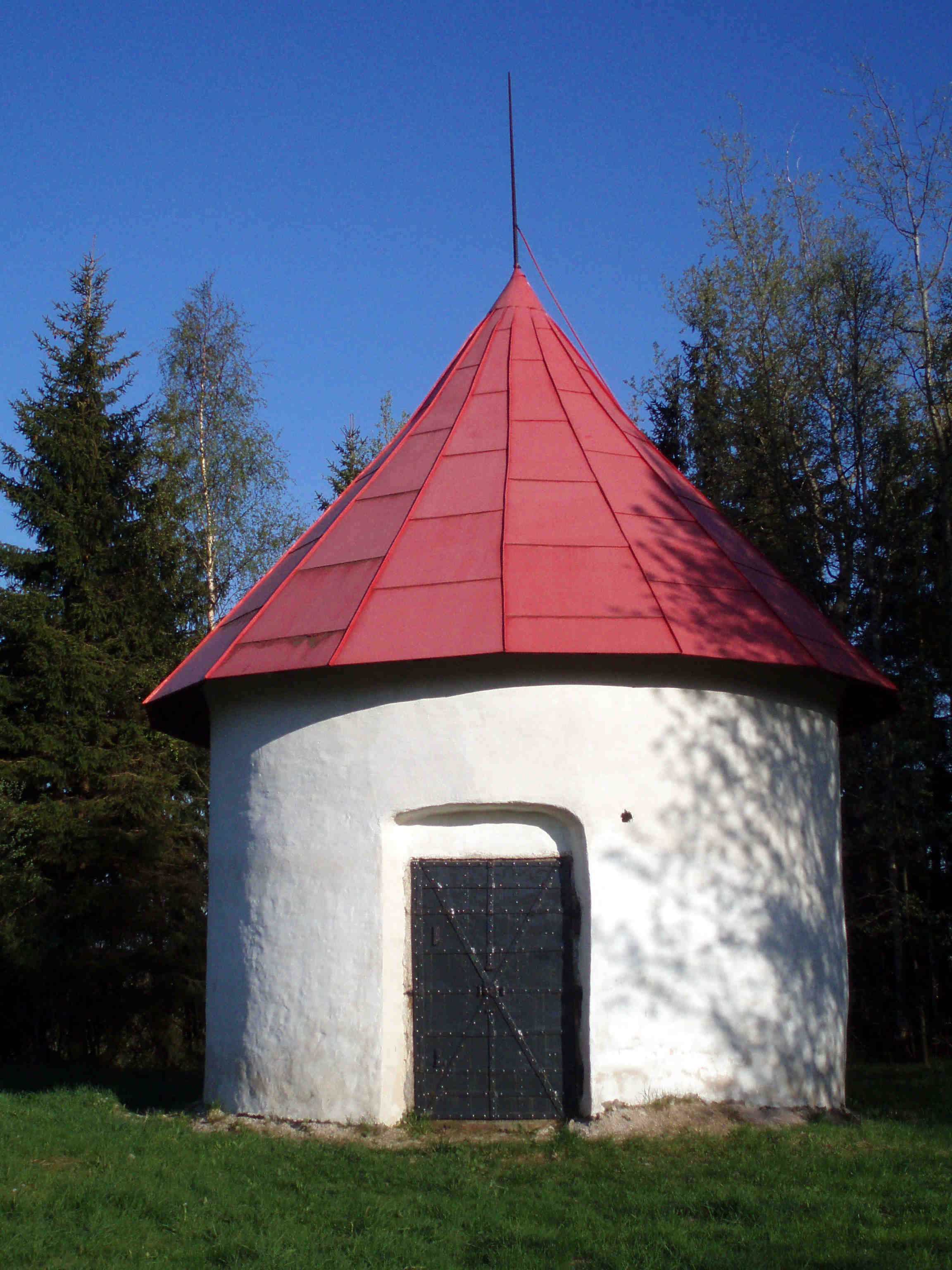
The Pulverturm in 2008

The Pulverturm in Johanngeorgenstadt was a tower used by the mining authorities for storing gunpowder for the Neu Leipziger Glück pit. It was built in 1798 in a sparsely settled region outside the town on the spoil heap of the Gotthelf Schaller pit on Eibenstocker Straße by the Neu Leipziger Glück Union. In 1828 it was sold for 105 Reichstaler as a mining area powder tower. The purchase price was advanced by the Royal Stolln, which also assumed responsibility for its repair. For every hundredweight of powder stored, the mines were then charged a taler towards the repayment of the advance. In 1864, the powder tower was sold to the district council for 50 thalers.

Due to the rising population of Johanngeorgenstadt, the powder tower now stands in the town centre, not far from a new housing area built in the mid-1980s, which today bears the name Am Pulverturm.

The powder tower is a witness to the mining history and is under monument protection.
