= Ore Mountain Ski Hiking Trail =

Cross-country ski route in Saxony, Germany

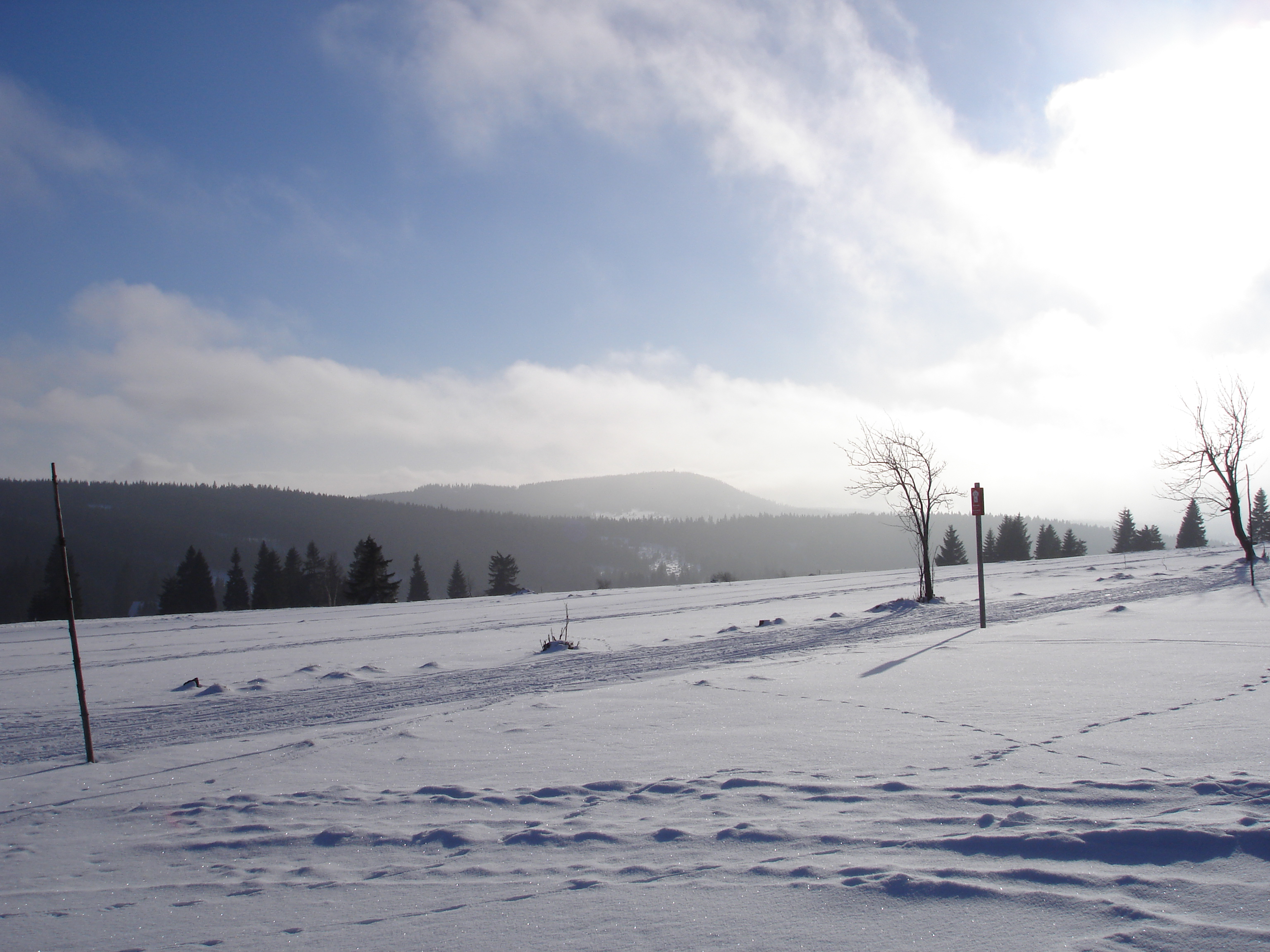
The ski trail between Boží Dar and Abertamy with a view looking towards Plešivec (Pleßberg)

The Ore Mountain Ski Hiking Trail (German: Skimagistrale Erzgebirge/Krušné hory) is a long distance, cross-country, ski hiking trail along the whole length of the Ore Mountain crest between Schöneck/Vogtl. and Altenberg.

== Course ==
Another cross-country ski route, the so-called Kammloipe trail runs from Schöneck in the Vogtland region via Mühlleithen to Johanngeorgenstadt in the Western Ore Mountains. This trail is entirely within the German state of Saxony.

Linked to it is the route of Ore Mountain/Krušné hory Ski Trail, known in German as the Skimagistrale or SM. This cross-country ski trail follows the general course of the Ore Mountain ridgeline, repeatedly alternating between Czech and German territory. It runs via Pernink, Boží Dar (Gottesgab), Kovářská, the Hirtstein, Rübenau, Hora Svaté Kateřiny (Sankt Katharinaberg) and Seiffen/Erzgeb. to Deutschgeorgenthal in the Eastern Ore Mountains. From there a third section, the Eastern Ore Mountain Trail (Osterzgebirgsloipe) runs through Teichhaus and Neurehefeld to the mining town of Altenberg.

Officially this cross-border ski trail is seen as a good example of the cooperation between the neighbouring Czech and German communities to promote the common aim of tourism in the Ore Mountains.

In reality, large sections of the long-distance ski trail are poorly signed or completely unsigned. As a result of the lack of agreement with the Czech authorities there is also an overlap with the Krušnohorská lyžařská magistrála (KLM), a long-distance ski trail in the Czech Republic that has existed since the 1970s.
