= Blatenský vrch =

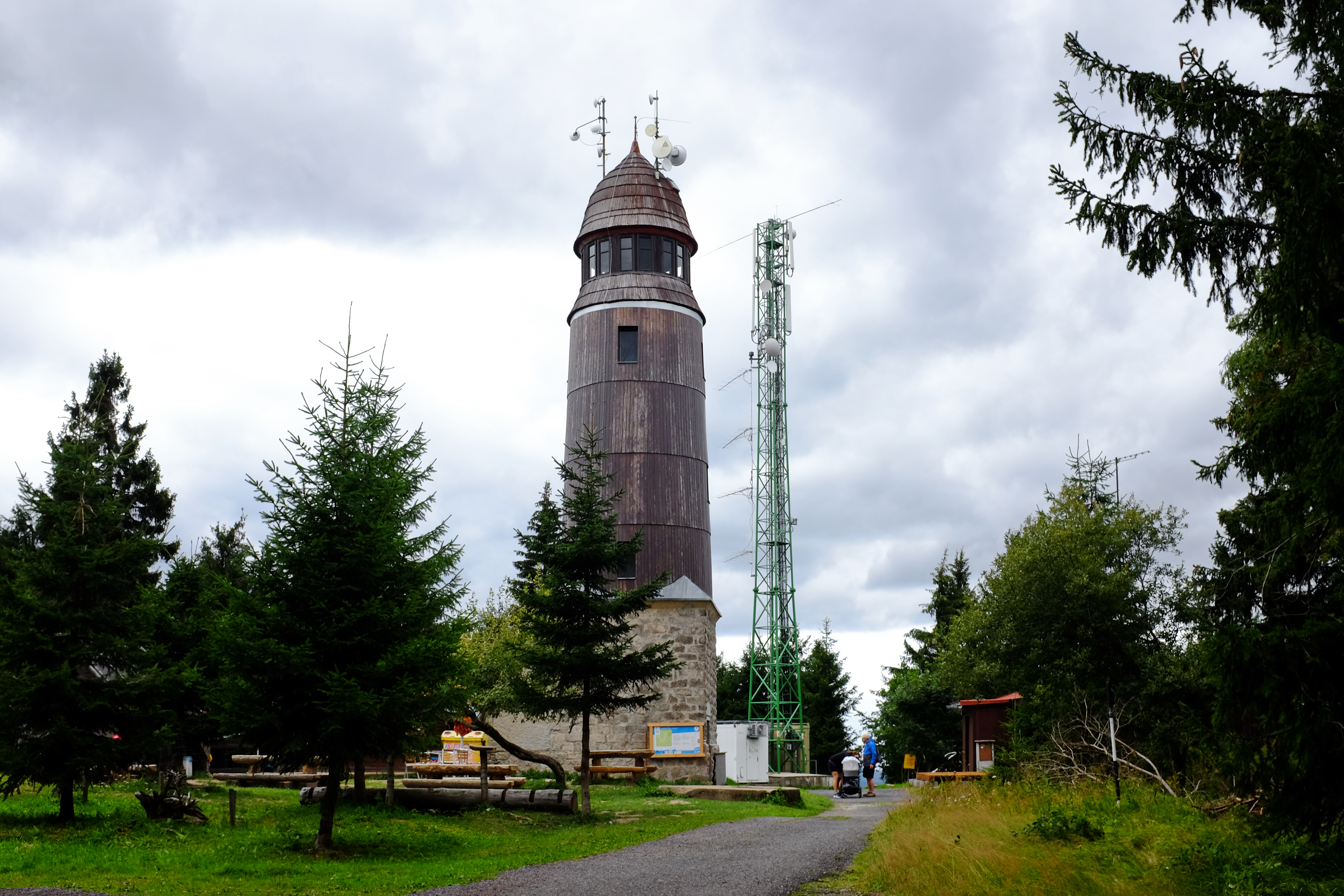
- Observation tower on the top of the Blatenský vrch

Highest point
- Elevation: 1,043 m (3,422 ft)
- Coordinates: 50°24′1″N 12°46′54″E

Geography
- Location within Czech Republic
- Location: Potůčky, Czech Republic
- Parent range: Ore Mountains

Geology
- Mountain type: Granite

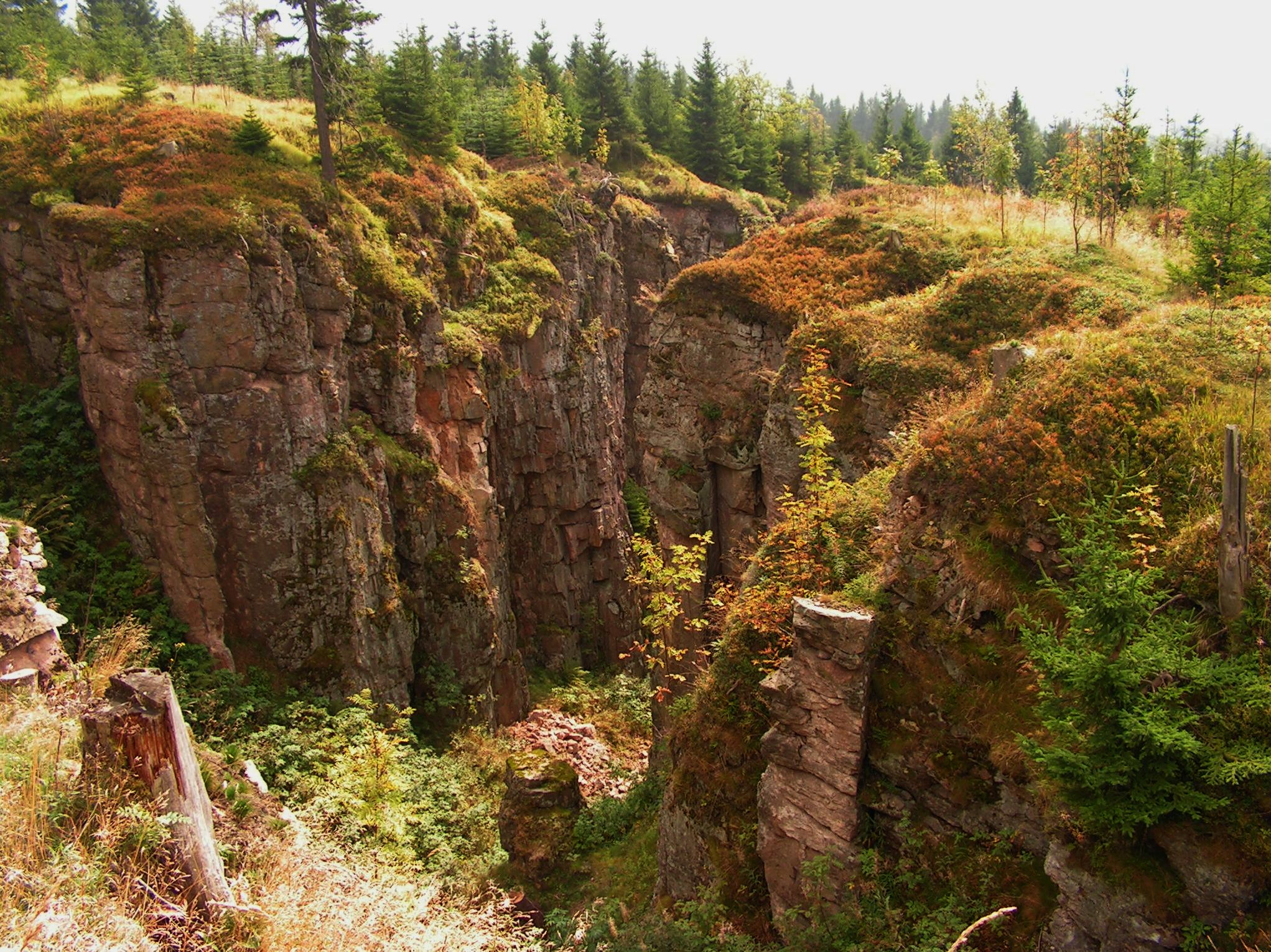
View towards the Vlčí jámy Nature Monument

The Blatenský vrch (German: Plattenberg) is a mountain in the Ore Mountains in the Czech Republic. It has an elevation of 1,043 m (3,422 ft). It is located near the town of Horní Blatná, however, it lies in the municipal territory of Potůčky.

== History ==
The mountain massif consists mainly of granite. By the Early Modern Era there was a lively tin and iron ore mining industry in the area of the mountain.
