= Rabenberg (Ore Mountains) =

Mountain in Saxony, Germany

Coordinates: 50°12′N 12°04′E

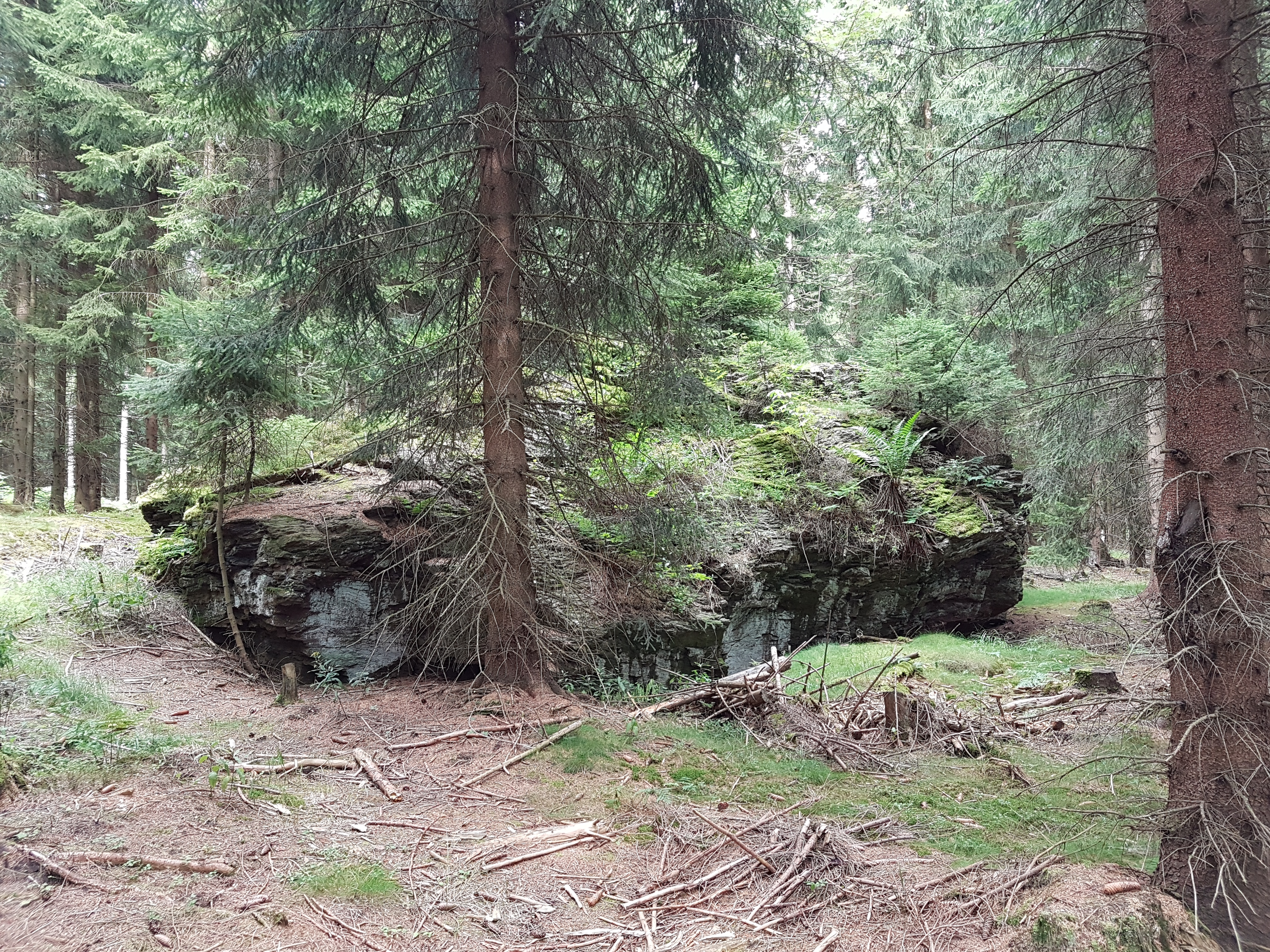
- The highest point of the Rabenberg is a rock on which there is an old survey point.

Highest point
- Elevation: 913 m (2,995 ft)

Geography
- Location: Saxony, Germany

Rabenberg is a mountain of Saxony, southeastern Germany.
