= Große Pyra =

River in Germany

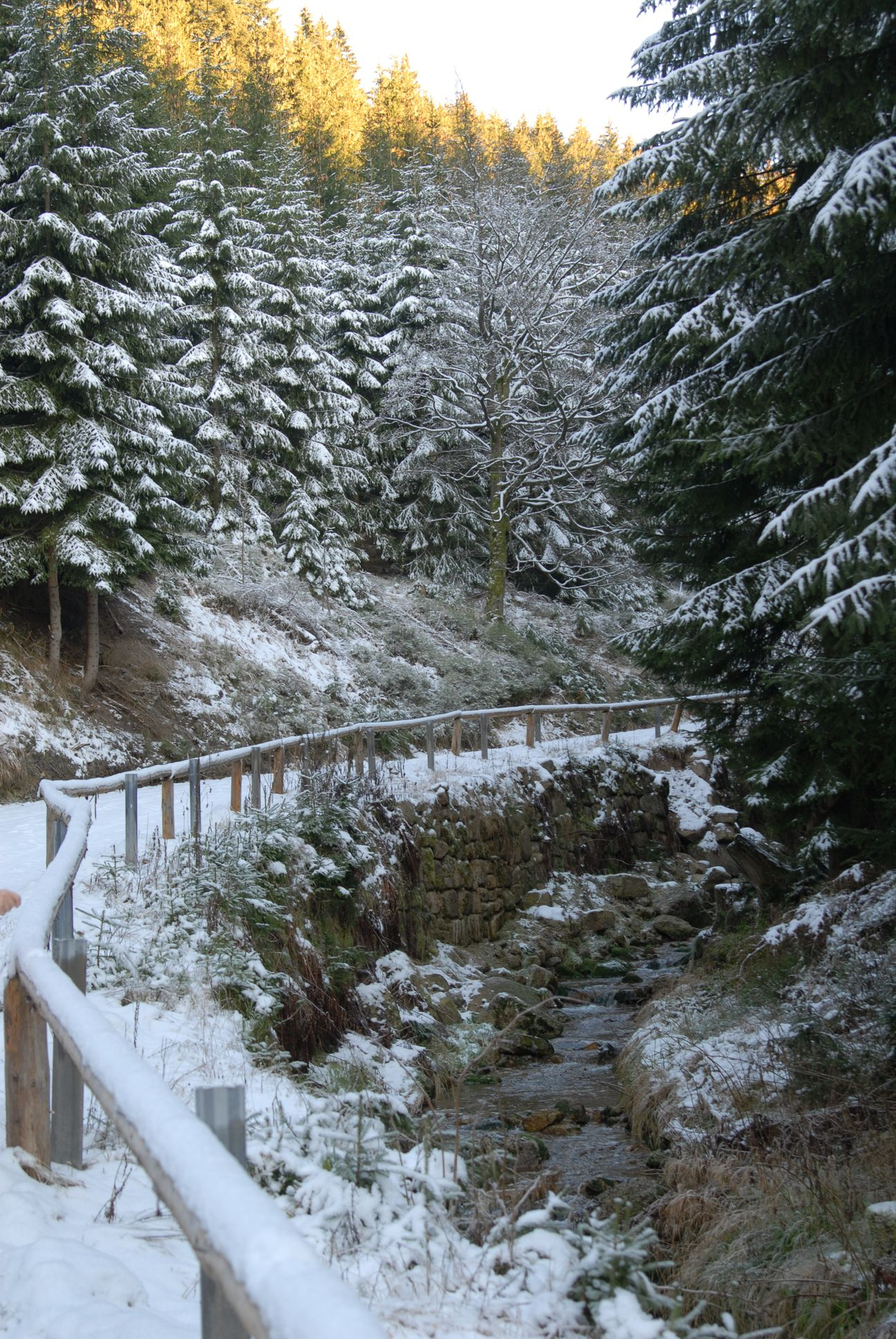

Location
- Country: Germany
- States: Saxony

Physical characteristics
- Mouth
  - location: Zwickauer Mulde
  - coordinates: 50.4586°N 12.4897°E

Basin features
- Progression: Zwickauer Mulde→ Mulde→ Elbe→ North Sea

The Große Pyra is a river of Saxony, Germany. It is a right tributary of the Zwickauer Mulde, which it joins in Morgenröthe-Rautenkranz.

== See also ==
- List of rivers of Saxony
