= Potůčky =

- Municipality
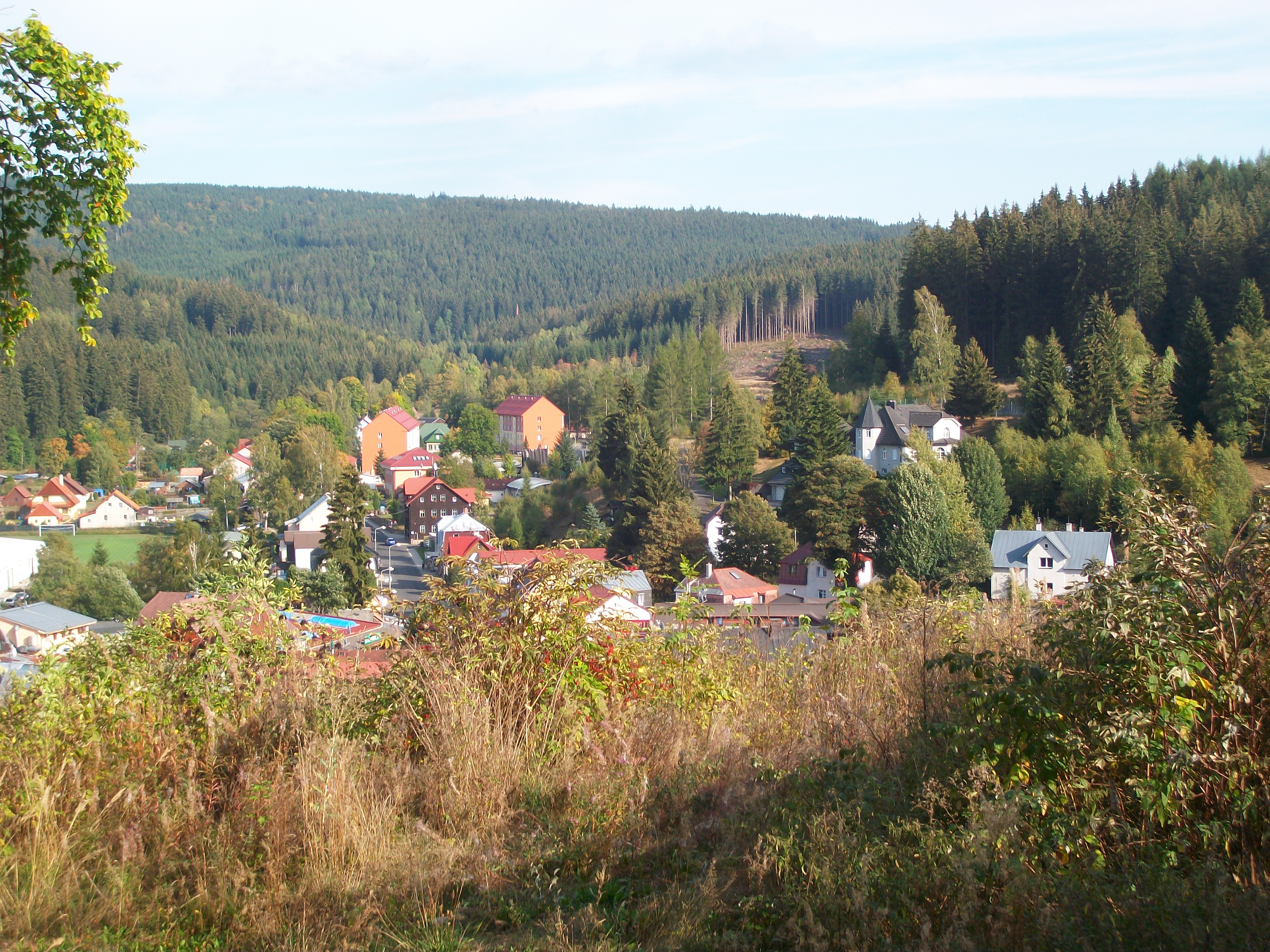
- General view

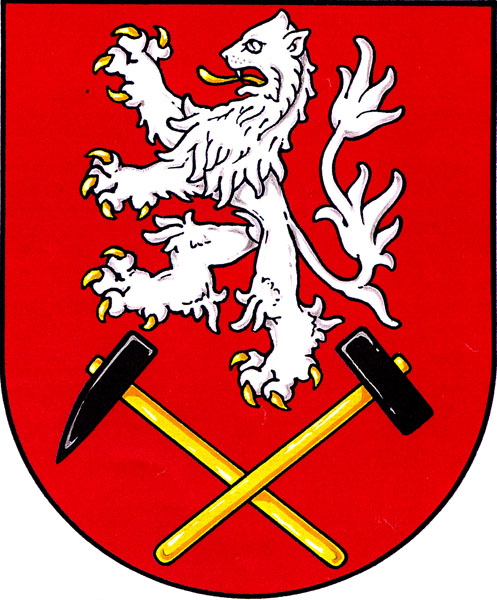
- Flag Coat of arms

- Location in the Czech Republic
- Coordinates: 50°25′42″N 12°44′12″E
- Country: Czech Republic
- Region: Karlovy Vary
- District: Karlovy Vary
- First mentioned: 1654

Area
  - Total: 32.00 km^{2} (12.36 sq mi)
- Elevation: 695 m (2,280 ft)

Population (2026-01-01)
  - Total: 405
  - Density: 12.7/km^{2} (32.8/sq mi)
- Time zone: UTC+1 (CET)
  - Summer (DST): UTC+2 (CEST)
- Postal code: 362 38
- Website: www.potucky-obec.cz

Potůčky (German: Breitenbach) is a municipality and village in Karlovy Vary District in the Karlovy Vary Region of the Czech Republic. It has about 400 inhabitants.

== Administrative division ==
Potůčky consists of two municipal parts (in brackets population according to the 2021 census):

- Potůčky (351)
- Stráň (43)

== Geography ==
Potůčky is located about 23 kilometres (14 mi) north of Karlovy Vary. It lies in the Ore Mountains, on the border with Germany. The municipality of Johanngeorgenstadt on the German side of the border was originally one settlement together with Potůčky. The highest point is the mountain Blatenský vrch at 1,043 m (3,422 ft) above sea level.

== Demographics ==
Historical population
Year	Pop.	±%
1869	1,098	—
1880	1,272	+15.8%
1890	1,387	+9.0%
1900	1,403	+1.2%
1910	1,560	+11.2%
1921	1,425	−8.7%
1930	1,692	+18.7%
1950	409	−75.8%
1961	341	−16.6%
1970	407	+19.4%
1980	359	−11.8%
1991	344	−4.2%
2001	369	+7.3%
2011	470	+27.4%
2021	394	−16.2%
Source: Censuses
