= Kleiner Kranichsee =

Coordinates: 50°25′04″N 12°40′27″E

The Kleiner Kranichsee (literally "Little Crane Lake", Czech: Malé jeřábí jezero) is one of the most important raised bogs in the Ore Mountains of Central Europe. The bog straddles the German/Czech border; the part lying in the German state of Saxony has been protected since 1930, whilst the Czech part (6.02 hectares) was declared a nature reserve in 1962.

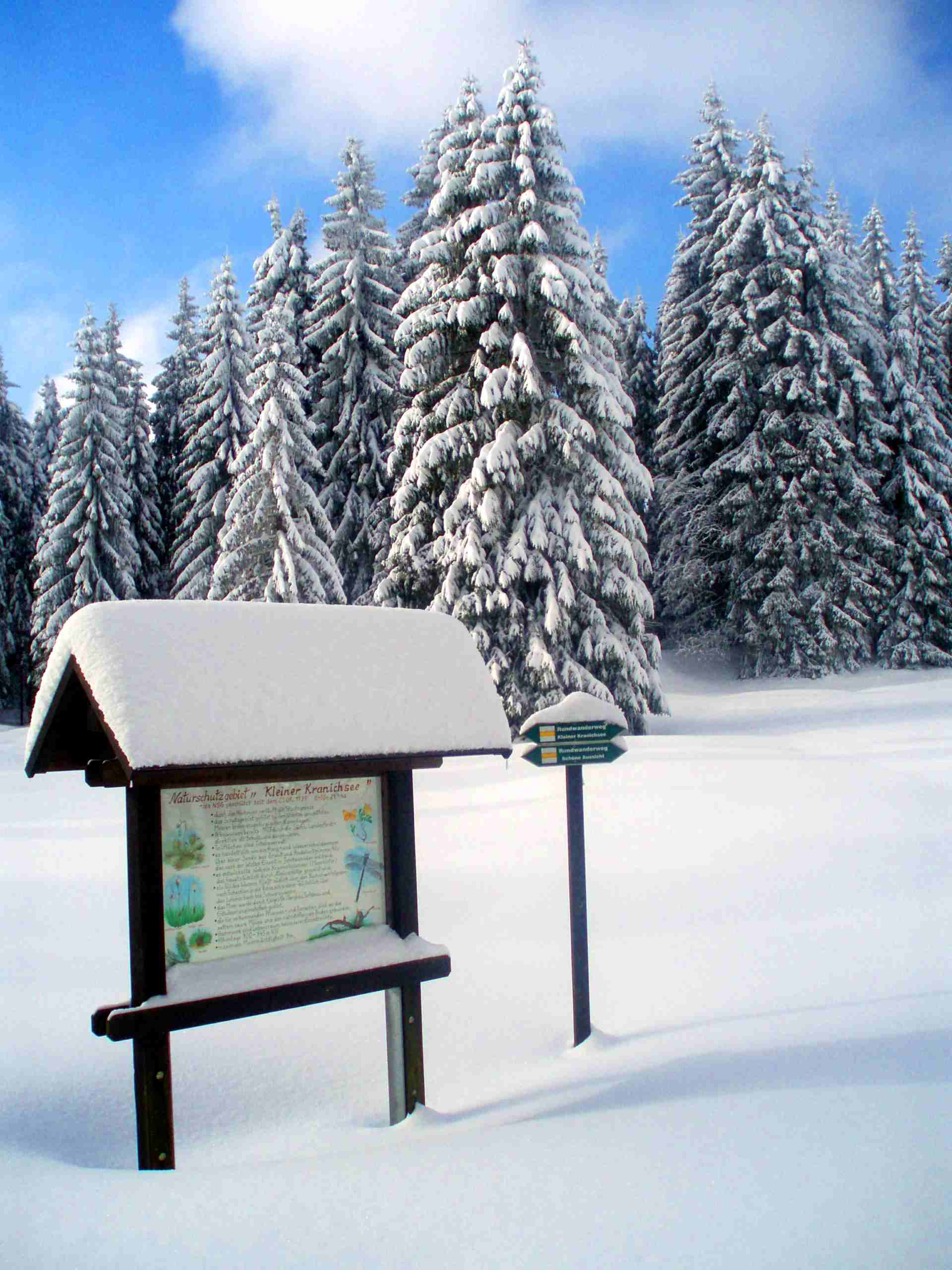
Winter at the Kleiner Kranichsee near Johanngeorgenstadt

== Location ==
The raised bog is located at an elevation of 930 metres above sea level (NN) in a clearing in the highland forest southwest of the town of Johanngeorgenstadt. The border between Germany and the Czech Republic runs through the bog and continues over the mountain of Buchschachtelberg.

== Name ==
The name of the raised bog is linked to the Czech word granica "meaning border". The Kleiner Kranichsee was first mentioned in historical records in 1551.

== Significance ==
It is a watershed- and krummholz raised bog that is drained towards the north by the Steinbach stream, to the west by the Große Bockau, to the south through the Buchschachtel ditch and to the east by the Lehmergrundbach stream. To the west lies the Großer Kranichsee ("Great Kranich Lake"), a bog whose heart lies on the Czech side of the border.

== Vegetation ==
- Mountain pine (Pinus mugo)
- Hare's-tail cottongrass (Eriophorum vaginatum)
- Black crowberry (Empetrum nigrum)
- Bog bilberry (Vaccinium uliginosum)
- Bog-rosemary (Andromeda polifolia)

== Fauna ==
- Adder (Vipera berus)
- Viviparous lizard (Lacerta vivipara)

== Tourism ==
By the turn of the century, the Ore Mountain Club branch at Johanngeorgenstadt laid a corduroy road into the bog and set up a viewing stand, which has since been replaced several times. Its location was moved about 30 years ago by several metres to better protect nature.

== Literature ==
- Um Aue, Schwarzenberg und Johanngeorgenstadt. Edition no. 1 Akademie-Verlag Berlin, Berlin 1972 (Werte unserer Heimat. Vol. 20). p. 190–194.
- Adolf Hanle (1992), "Kleiner Kranichsee", Erzgebirge, Meyers Naturführer (in German), Mannheim u. a.: Meyers Lexikonverlag, pp. 81f.
- Eduard Wagner: Der sterbende See. In: Erzgebirgs-Zeitung, 52nd year, 1931, pp. 2–7. (Digitalisat)
- Landkreis Erzgebirgskreis: Naturschutzfachliche Würdigung zum „Naturschutzgebiet Kleiner Kranichsee, Butterwegmoor und Henneberger Hang“ im Erzgebirgskreis, Annaberg 2011, 20 pages digitalised
