= Scheffelsberg =

Coordinates: 50°24′07.109″N 12°41′43.767″E

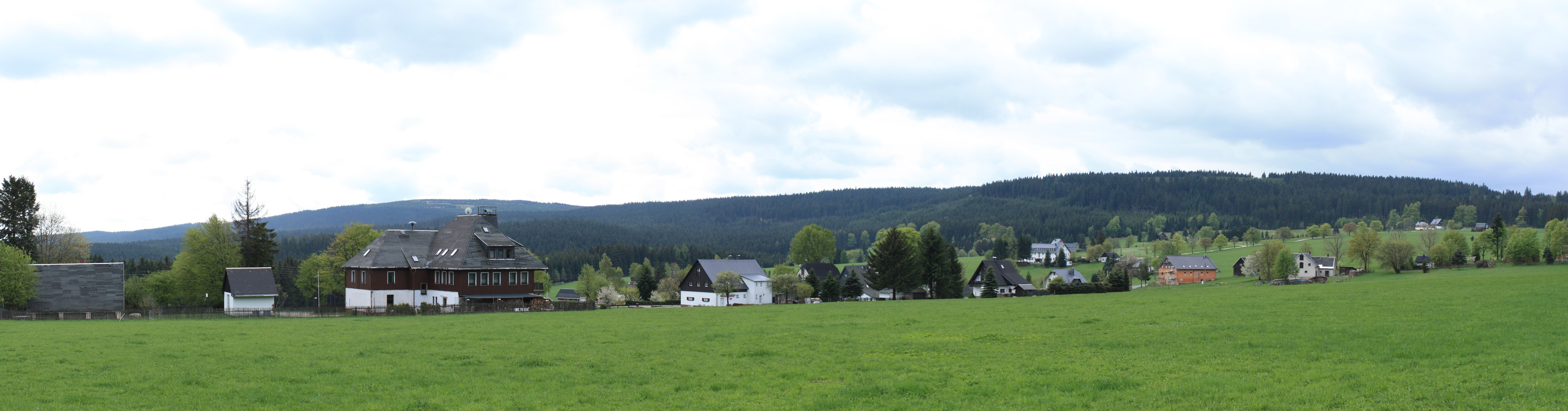
View over Oberjugel to the Scheffelsberg (left)

The Scheffelsberg (Czech: Korec) is a forested mountain south of Jugel in the western Saxon Ore Mountains, which is 980 metres high. The Czech–German border runs over its summit.

In winter, a cross-country skiing trail runs from Henneberg via the Scheffelsberg towards the border. In clear visibility there is a good view of the Saxon-Bohemian upper Ore Mountains from the nearby peak of Buchschachtelberg through the trees.

== Literature ==
- Wander- und Wintersportkarte des Erzgebirges, Sheet 3 - Auersberg, im Auftrag des Sächs. Finanzministeriums published by the Reichsamt für Landesaufnahme, 1928.
