= Buchschachtelberg =

Coordinates: 50°24′36.657″N 12°40′52.474″E

The Buchschachtelberg (Czech: Bučina) is a forested mountain south of Henneberg in the western Saxon Ore Mountains, which is 973 metres high. The border between Germany and the Czech Republic runs over its summit.

Northwest of the Buchschachtelberg lies the Kleiner Kranichsee.

In winter a cross-country skiing trail runs past the Buchschachtelberg and via the Scheffelsberg from Henneberg towards the border. In clear visibility there is a good view from the Buchschachtelberg of the Saxon-Bohemian upper Ore Mountains.

West of the mountain runs the Buchschachtelgraben stream, on Czech territory.

== Literature ==
- Wander- und Wintersportkarte des Erzgebirges, Blatt 3 - Auersberg, im Auftrag des Sächs. Finanzministeriums published by the Reichsamt für Landesaufnahme, 1928.
