= Bahnbetriebswerk (steam locomotives) =

A Bahnbetriebswerk (also abbreviated to Betriebswerk, Bw or BW) is a German railway depot where the maintenance of locomotives and other rolling stock is carried out. It is roughly equivalent to a locomotive shed, running shed or motive power depot. These were of great importance during the steam locomotive era to ensure the smooth running of locomotive-hauled services. Bahnbetriebswerke had a large number of facilities in order to be able to carry out their various maintenance tasks. As a result, they needed a lot of staff and were often the largest employers in the area.

The history and present-day importance of such depots is covered in the Bahnbetriebswerk article.

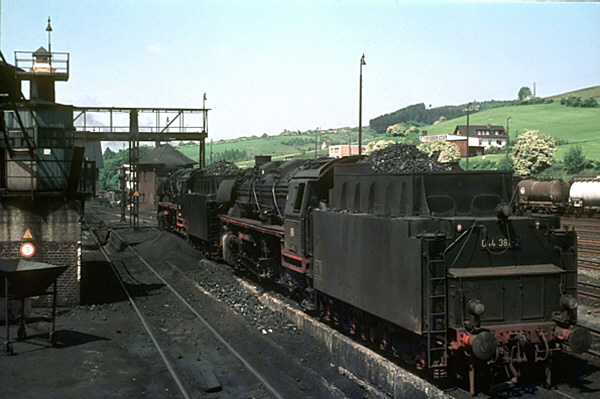
Locomotive facilities at Bahnbetriebswerk Ottbergen

== Functions ==
=== Preparation of engines ===
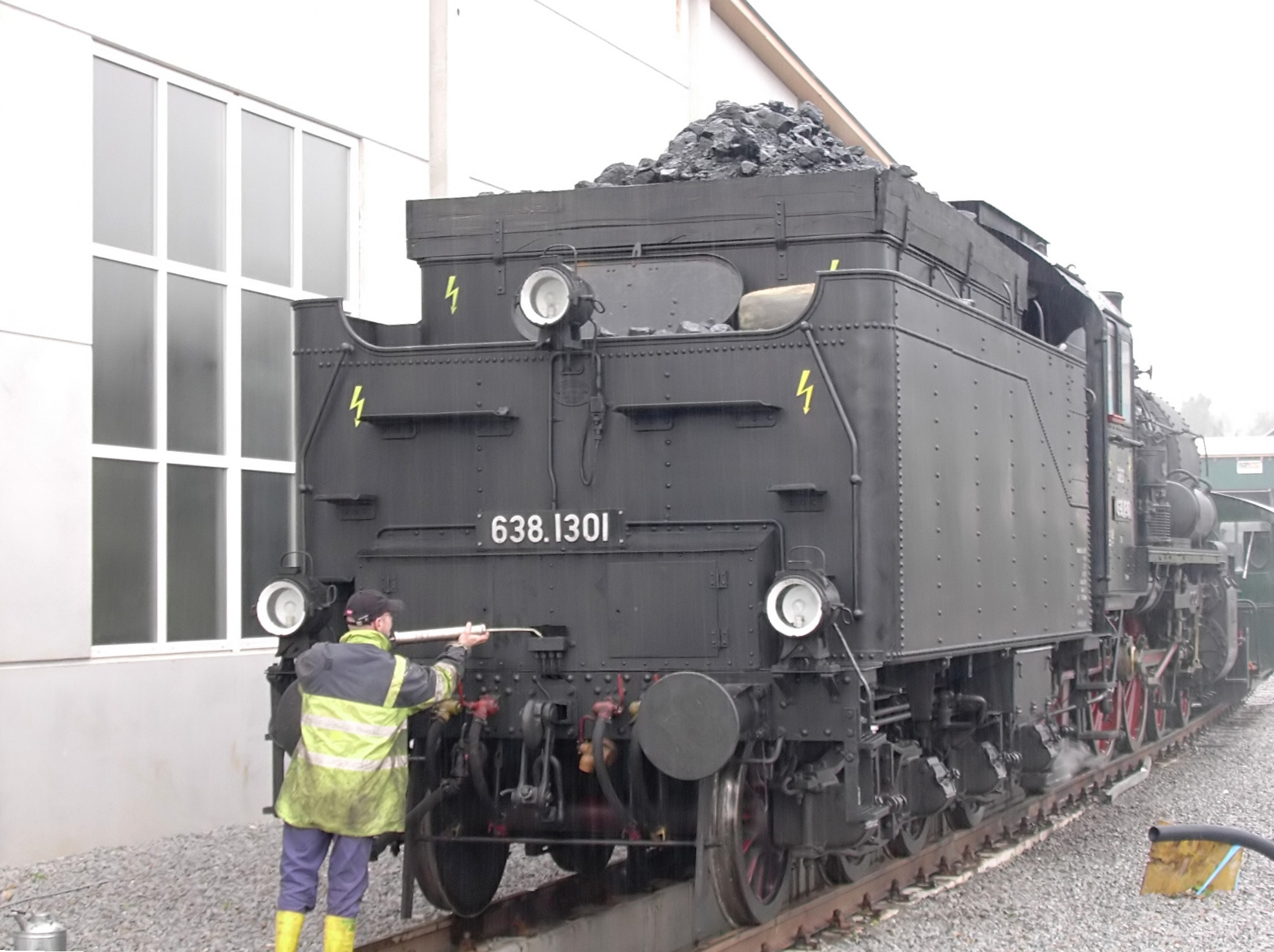
Locomotive 638.1301 being greased

Before a steam locomotive was allowed onto the line, the crew had to carry out a large number of preparatory jobs. In accordance with the enginemen roster, the locomotive crew – engine driver and fireman – reported to the running foreman of the Betriebswerk in question. There they were given the key to their locomotive, a repair book, a route plan and timetable and a list of the trackworks en route. After completing all the formalities, the engine driver and fireman went to their engine, which was either berthed in the locomotive shed or stabled on a siding. After climbing into the driver's cab, the engine driver began with the most important checks: regulator, valve seals, water levels and a brake test. The fireman checked the equipment on board and the fuel supplies. Not until these checks had been carried out did the crew begin their actual work.

The fireman began by lighting the fire in the locomotive, then driving it to an inspection pit. Whilst the engine driver looked underneath the engine for any damage, the fireman - equipped with oil can and grease gun - had to service all the grease points on the locomotive (see photograph).

Once all the checks had been carried out and the boiler had reached its operating pressure, the locomotive could drive out of the shed and onto the turntable. After the tracks had been cleared by the signal box, the locomotive officially began its duties and ran out onto the main line.

=== Disposal of engines ===
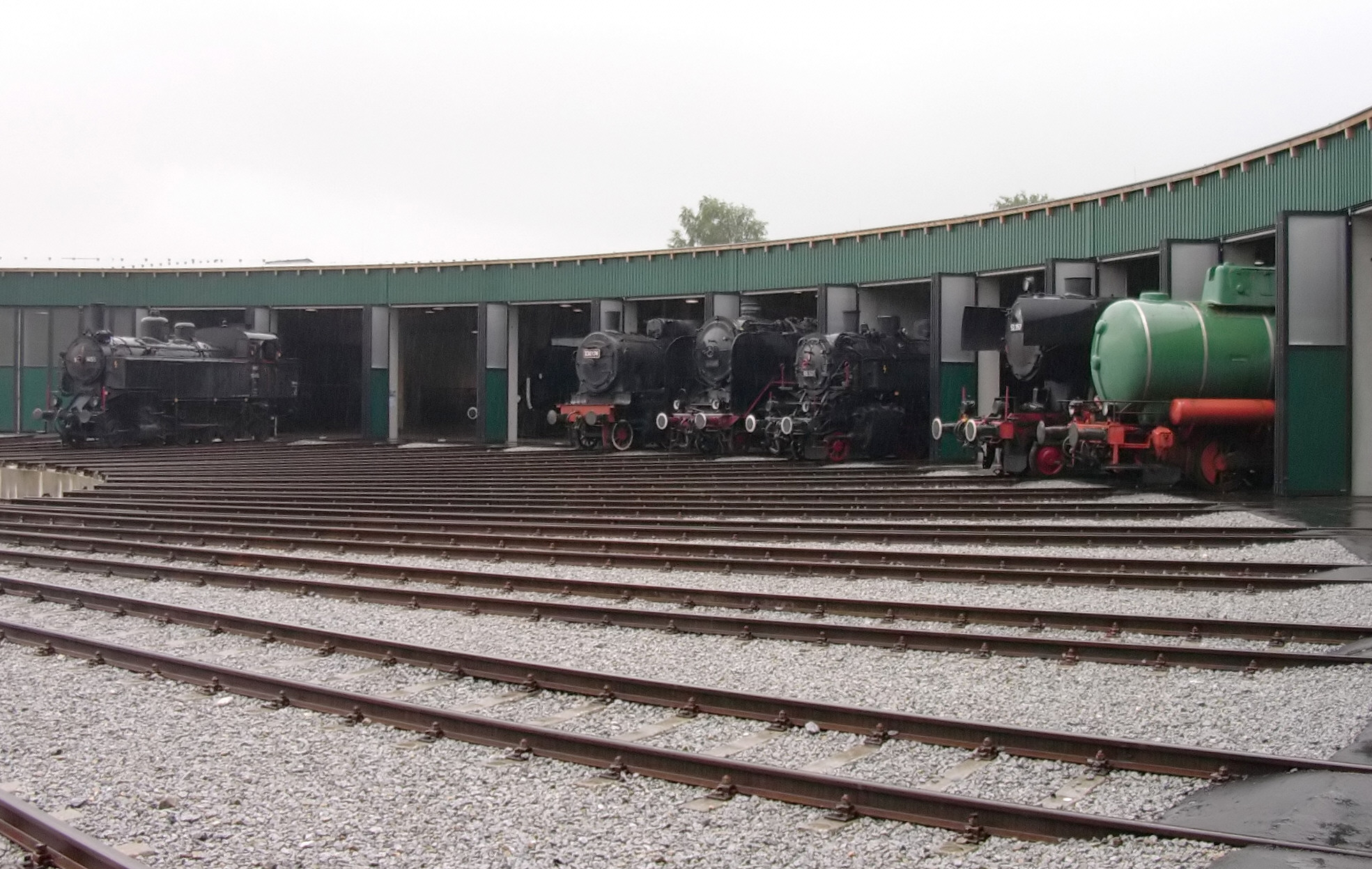
A roundhouse

During the final kilometres to the terminal station the fireman began to prepare for disposal (Abrüsten) by letting the fire slowly burn down depending on demands of the route. After the train had arrived at the terminus, the fireman turned off the train heating and the locomotive was uncoupled from the wagons. Then the locomotive was returned to the Betriebswerk, where it first went to the coaling plant, where its coal was replenished. Next the engine proceeded to the ashpit where the boiler was cleaned out by the shed workers (Betriebsarbeiter). This involved emptying the ash and clinker from the smokebox and grate into an ashpit sunk between the tracks. This was a particularly dirty job. After completely cleaning out the boiler the engine was run to the water cranes, where the engine's water tanks were refilled. The next stop was the sanding point. At smaller Betriebswerke, refilling the sanders was manual work using buckets and ladders.

Because the locomotive was now fully equipped with everything it needed for its next duty, it was either stabled in the locomotive shed or on a spare stabling road and cleaned further by the fireman. Repairs were dealt with by the staff responsible for them during the night. Afterwards the engine was prepared for its next duty.

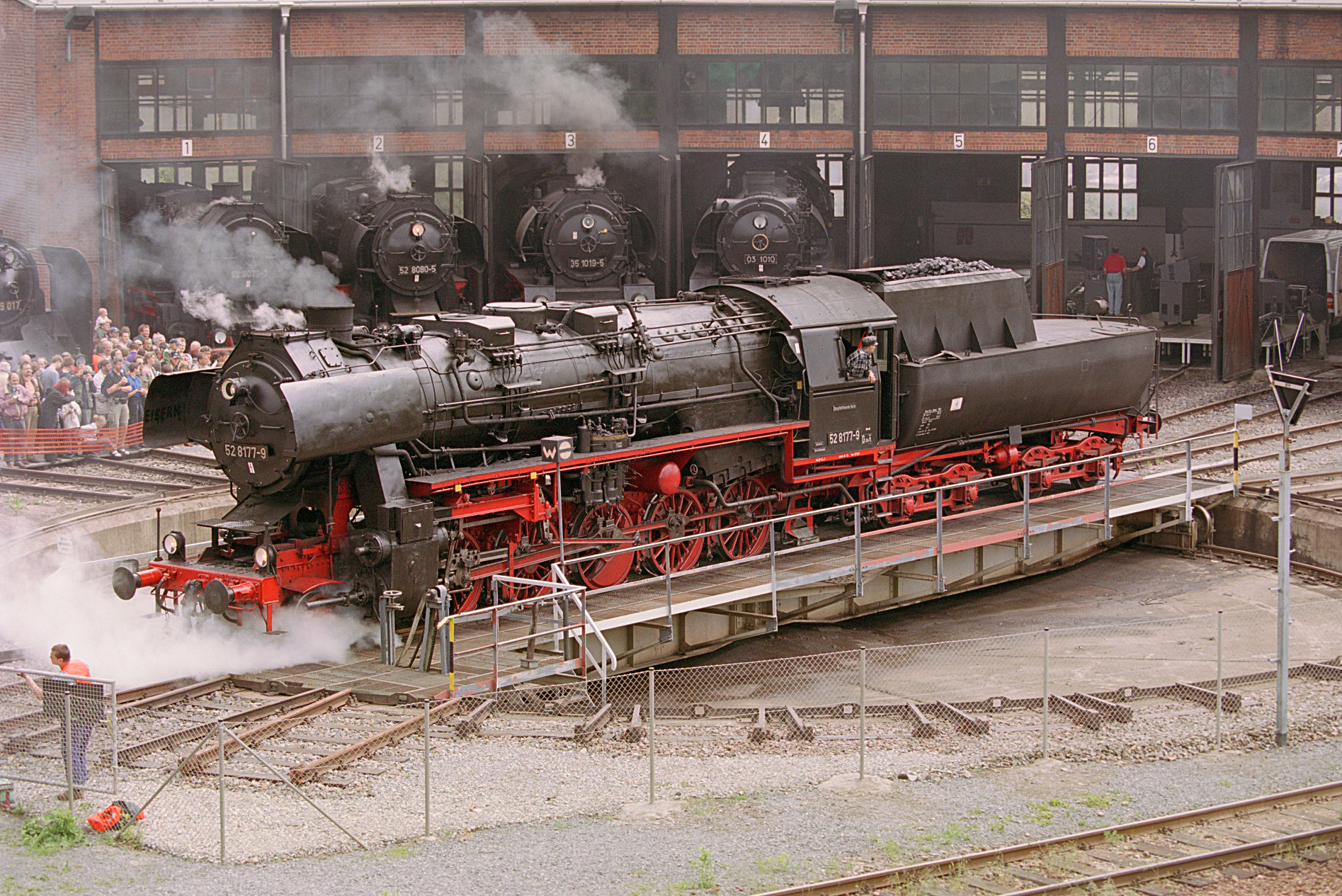
A DRG Class 52 on the turntable

=== Washing out ===
The boiler of a steam locomotive had to be cleaned at regular intervals. This took place in the Bahnbetriebswerk at laid down times. The interval between boiler washouts varied according to the quality of the boiler feedwater, the frequency of runs and the demands of the routes being worked on the locomotive. The washing out of a steam locomotive boiler consisted in six stages of work:

First the boiler had to be blown down. After it had cooled, the water was drained. Once this was completed, the cleaning of the boiler could begin. After that the boiler was refilled and heated up again.

When a locomotive was due for boiler cleaning, preparations for washing out were started even whilst the locomotive was on its final run beforehand.

=== Routine examinations and scheduled repair work ===
Whilst the shed hands were busy washing out a locomotive, fitters carried out routine examinations and scheduled repair tasks. This work was necessary in order to keep the engine operational for as long as possible between general inspections. In order to keep stoppages of locomotives to a minimum this work was distributed throughout the year. Amongst the most important tasks were the biannual brake system checks, the quarterly condition examinations and a yearly main brake inspection. Special tasks are detailed in the following table.

Job	Interval
Test brakes	no more than 4 days
Test service brake	daily
Clean sanders	no more than 4 days
Grease axle boxes	no more than 4 days
Check oil oiling points	no more than 4 days
Check central lubricating system	no more than 4 days
Clean trailing box and check oil pipes	no more than 4 days
Oil Schlingerkeile and outer firebox supports	no more than 4 days
Check small suspension rods and compensating lever	daily
Grease brake linkages, clean oil ducts	no more than 4 days
Grease connecting rod bearings	no more than 4 days
Check glides and hinge bolts	daily
Check valve gear	no more than 4 days
Check wheel flange greasing	no more than 4 days

Job	Interval
Check tools and implements	no more than 4 days
Check boiler feedwater equipment	no more than 4 days
Check drainage valves	no more than 4 days
Check steam and hot water pipes	no more than 4 days
Check firebox	daily
Check water level gauges	daily
Check sludge removal equipment	daily
Check boiler safety valves	daily
Check ash pan and smokebox sprayer	no more than 4 days
Check chimney (Rauchfänger) and spark arrestor	daily
Carry out basic seal checks	no more than 4 days
Check the small suspension rods, bogie pins, suspension springs, axleboxes and greasing points on the tender	no more than 4 days
Check connecting rods and coupling rods	180 days

=== Special duty trains ===
In addition to the maintenance of all locomotives, some Bahnbetriebswerke are also responsible for looking after special duty trains. The important units are breakdown trains (for re-railing derailed rolling stock) and rotary snow ploughs. There are also fire fighting trains to enable fires in the area to be put out as quickly as possible. And for the running of a Bahnbetriebswerk tractors and shunters are needed in order to move wagons and locomotives that are unable to move under their own power. Almost every Bahnbetriebswerk has a variety of special vehicles.

== Facilities ==
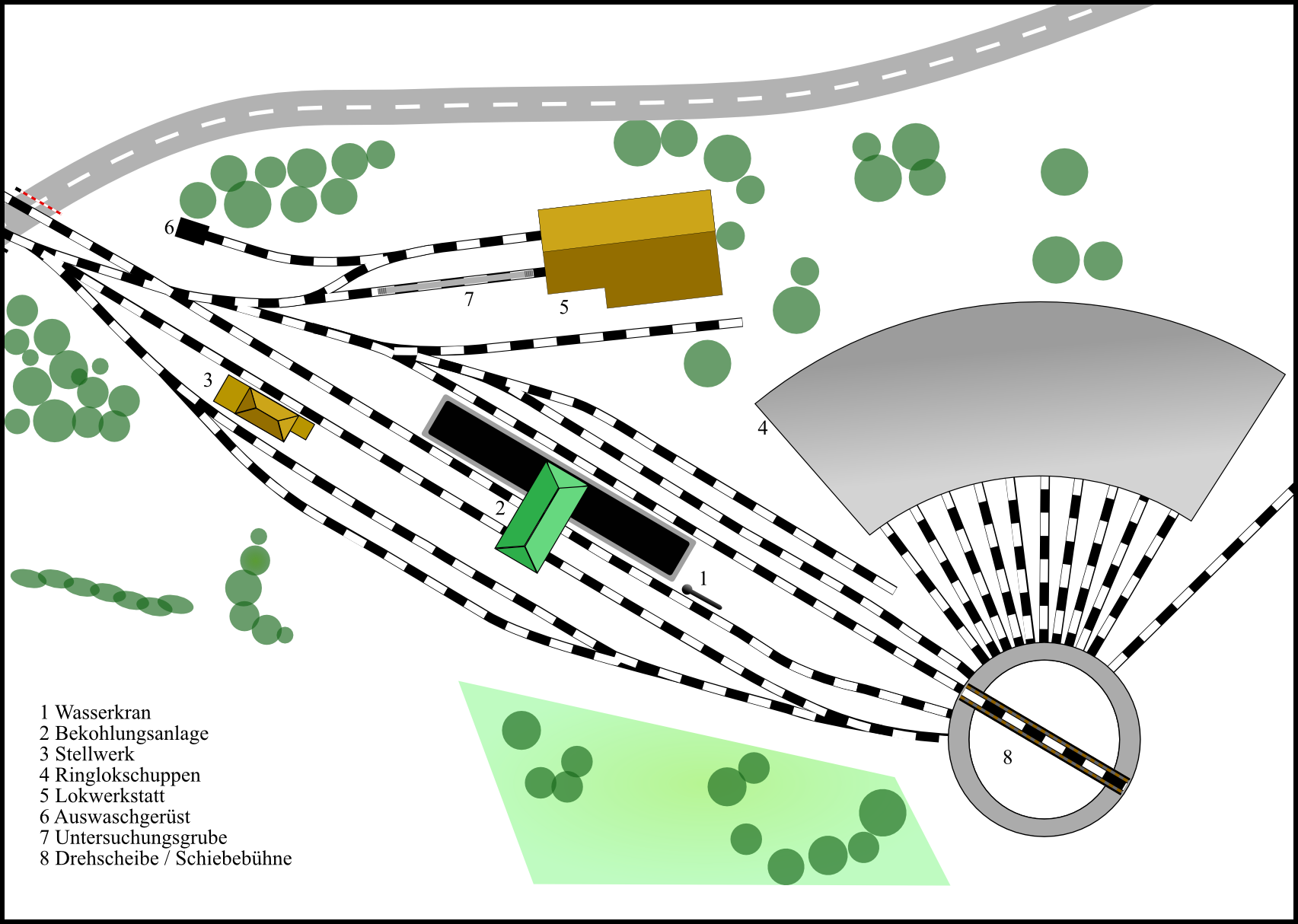

Key: 1 - Water crane, 2 - Coaling point, 3 - Signal box, 4 - Roundhouse, 5 - Locomotive repair shop, 6 - Washout equipment, 7 - Inspection pit, 8 - Turntable.

=== Operating facilities ===
The maintenance of a steam locomotive requires a large number of different facilities.

==== Water points ====
The running of steam locomotives required water as well as coal. As a result, the water supply of a Betriebswerk played an important role. In order to guarantee the supply, almost all Bahnbetriebswerk had their own railway waterworks. These waterworks were equipped with various systems for delivering water (pumps, pipes, water containers and take-off points). Many Bahnbetriebswerke had two different waterworks: one railway waterworks that provided water for the engines and a drinking waterworks that supplied water for the employees of the depot. When Betriebswerke were eventually connected to the regional water network, their drinking waterworks was usually closed down. The water was extracted from springs, wells and ponds and then cleaned. Industrial water for the running the steam locomotives had to have a high level of quality. As a result, the railway waterworks developed their own filtering systems, where the water for operations was made usable. Especially important were the salt content and the hardness of the water.

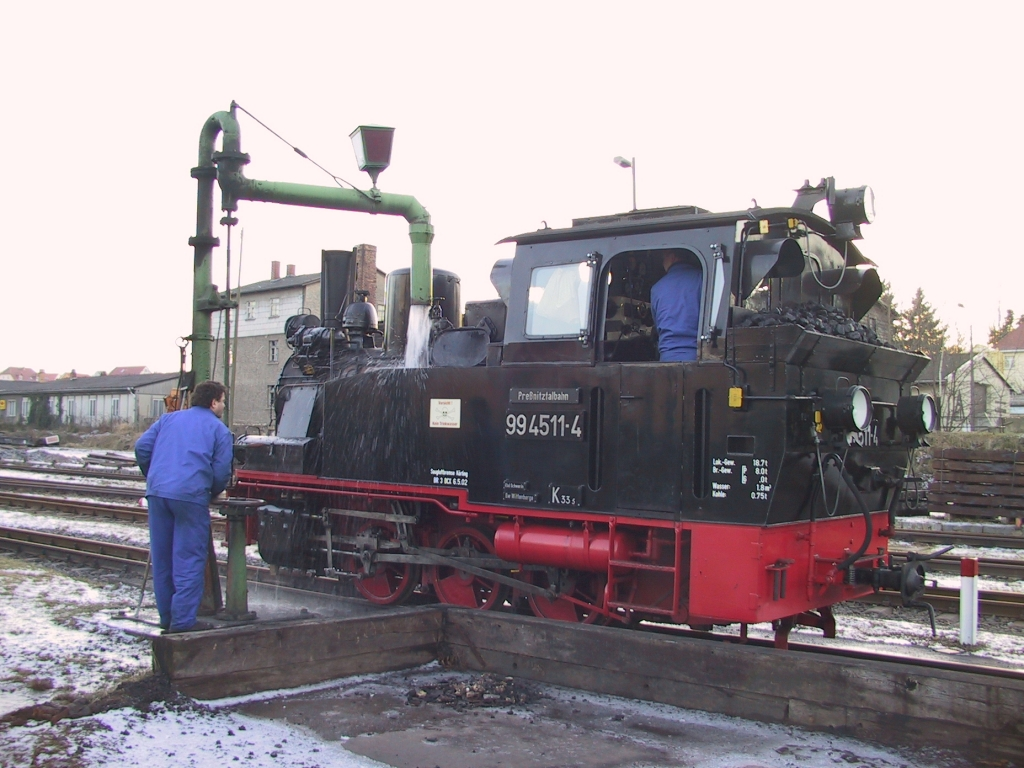
Steam engine filling up from a water crane

After cleaning, the industrial water was pumped into a water tower and drawn from there. These facilities had various designs; there was no standard type. All water towers had several up and down pipes. The water towers supplied all areas with industrial water, including the water cranes used to replenish the water supplies of steam locomotives (whether they had tenders or water tanks). Water cranes were usually located near the inspection pits or at coaling points. They, too, came in various shapes and sizes, although these were gradually replaced by standard types of water crane.

Large and medium-sized Bahnbetriebswerke had their own laboratory that continuously monitored the water processing; in particularly checking the preparation of the boiler feedwater which was tested regularly. The laboratory specified the salt content, the pH value and the composition of the feedwater. The enginemen had to bring samples of feedwater to the laboratory at specified intervals. In addition to testing the water, the laboratory was also responsible for checking oils and greases delivered to the depot.

==== Locomotive sheds ====
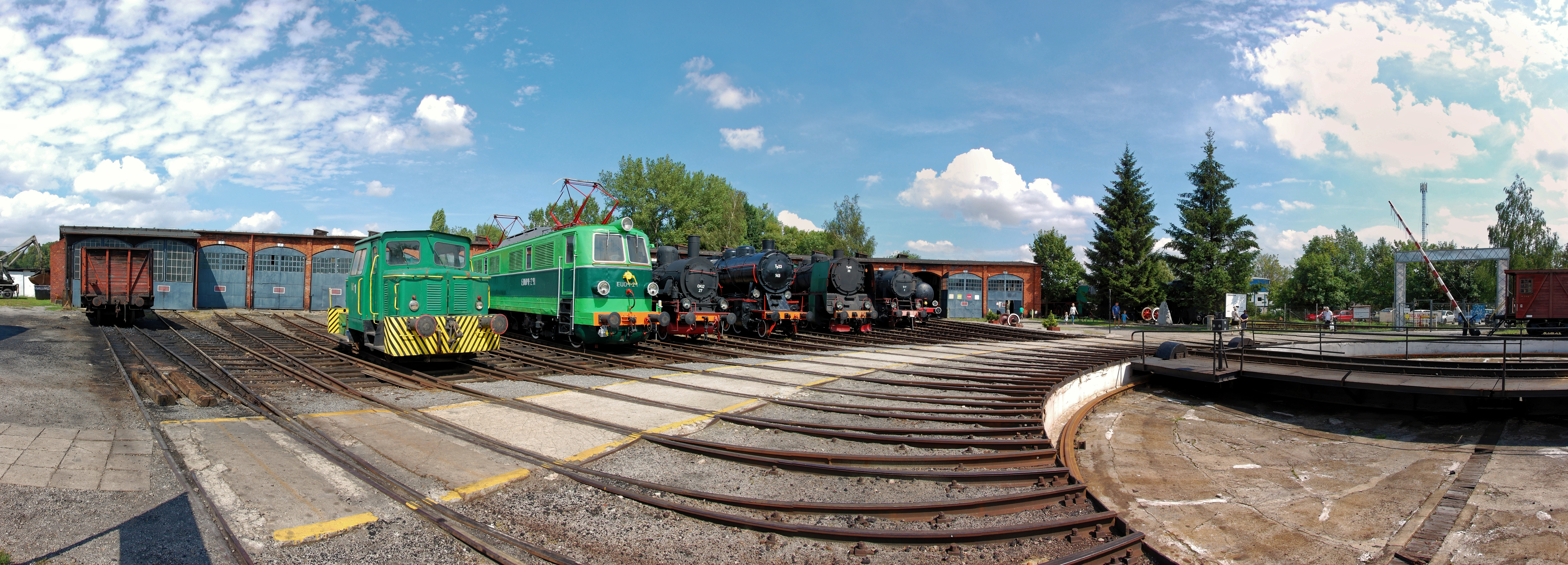
The roundhouse and the turntable at the Museum of Industry and Railway in Silesia, Jaworzyna Śląska, Poland

Every large Betriebswerk had its own roundhouse with a turntable. The locomotives were turned on the turntable and berthed in the roundhouse. This was heated so that the steam locomotives did not fully cool down, otherwise raising steam took too long. In order to move steam locomotives that were stored 'cold', locomotive winches were installed. It was prescribed by almost all railway companies that at least 75% of all locomotives had to be able to be berthed in the locomotive shed, the rest would be stabled on stabling roads in the open.

Large Betriebswerke often had two or three roundhouses with their associated turntables. The roundhouse was reliant on the turntable; if it became incapacitated the entire shed was out of commission because locomotives could not be run in or out of it. The turntable therefore had an emergency engine which used compressed air. Over the course of time, a standard turntable with a 26m long track was adopted. Turntables were always at the mercy of the weather and in very heavy use, so they had to be serviced at regular intervals. In fact every Bahnbetriebswerk with a turntable should also have had a triangle or wye, so that if the turntable was out of action, locomotives could still be turned. However, because wyes needed a lot of space they were only rarely built.

Smaller Betriebswerke often only had a parallel-road shed, which could be reached via turnouts. Every Bahnbetriebswerk had to have enough space in order that it could be extended in any direction. Smaller maintenance jobs were carried out in the locomotive shed itself. For more specialised repair or maintenance tasks there was usually an engine repair shop, most of which had an overhead crane with which heavy components could be moved.

==== Sanding points ====
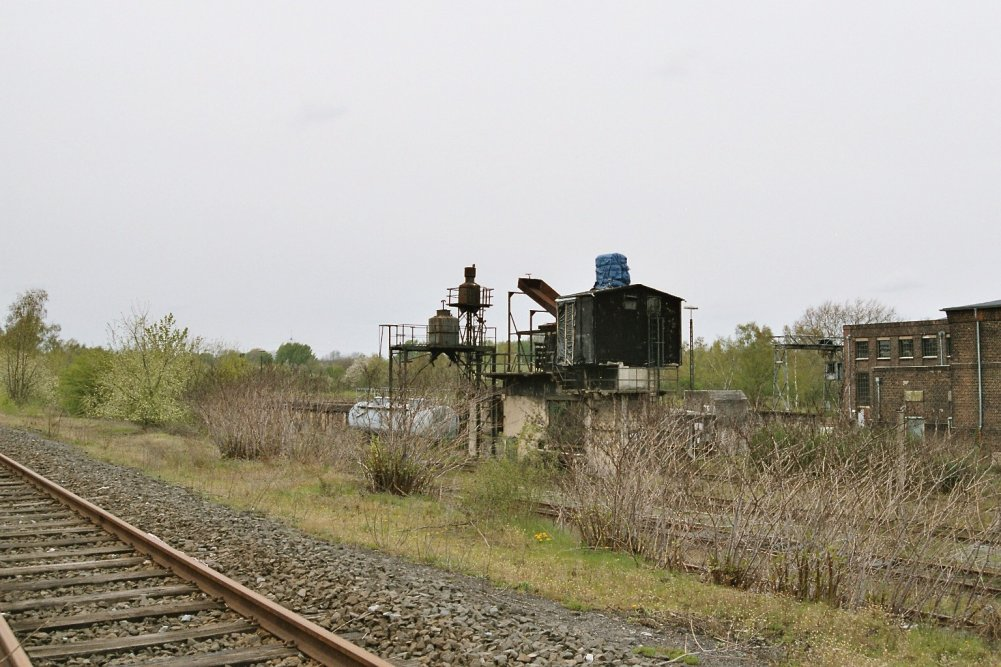
The sanding point at a former Bahnbetriebswerk

Trouble-free locomotive running requires that there is sufficient traction between wheel and rail. Steam engines therefore had sandboxes (usually two, on top of the boiler). These were filled with the help of sanding equipment. For sanding there was either a sanding system with an elevated bunker or a sanding tower. The special sand was kept in its own store. On a sanding tower a telescopic pipe was hooked up to the sandbox, the lock released and the locomotive sandbox filled as required. All Betriebswerke had to have enough sand for at least 30 days.

==== Coaling points ====
Every Bahnbetriebswerk had one or more coaling points for the delivery and unloading of coal. In addition, they had to store the fuel and carry out the replenishment of locomotive coal tanks or tenders. Coaling facilities came in various shapes and sizes, dependent on the daily consumption. Coal was delivered was by rail, either using normal goods wagons or with special self-discharging hoppers. The coal was stored in large bunkers (Kohlebansen) which usually had side walls made of concrete (on smaller Betriebswerke these were also made of old sleepers and section of rail.) Each Bahnbetriebswerk stored the daily coal requirement in a main bunker, the rest of the coal was stored in one or more reserve bunkers.

Coaling the locomotives could be carried out in various ways. Many Betriebswerke ferried the coal from the bunkers using small narrow gauge tub wagons on rails to a rotating crane which then lifted them and tippled their contents into the tender of the locomotive. Large Betriebswerke had coaling stages or large coaling plants that had four filled hopper-like bunkers which were equipped with locking devices. When these were removed, the coal ran down into the locomotive tender. With this type, coal was transferred to the four small bunkers from the main bunkers using a large crane. Because these two variants needed rather a lot of space, small and medium-sized Betriebswerke had an overhead chute. The coal was transported in tub wagons again; these were then placed in a lift, hoisted up and then tippled down the chute, allowing the coal to run into the tender of the steam locomotive.

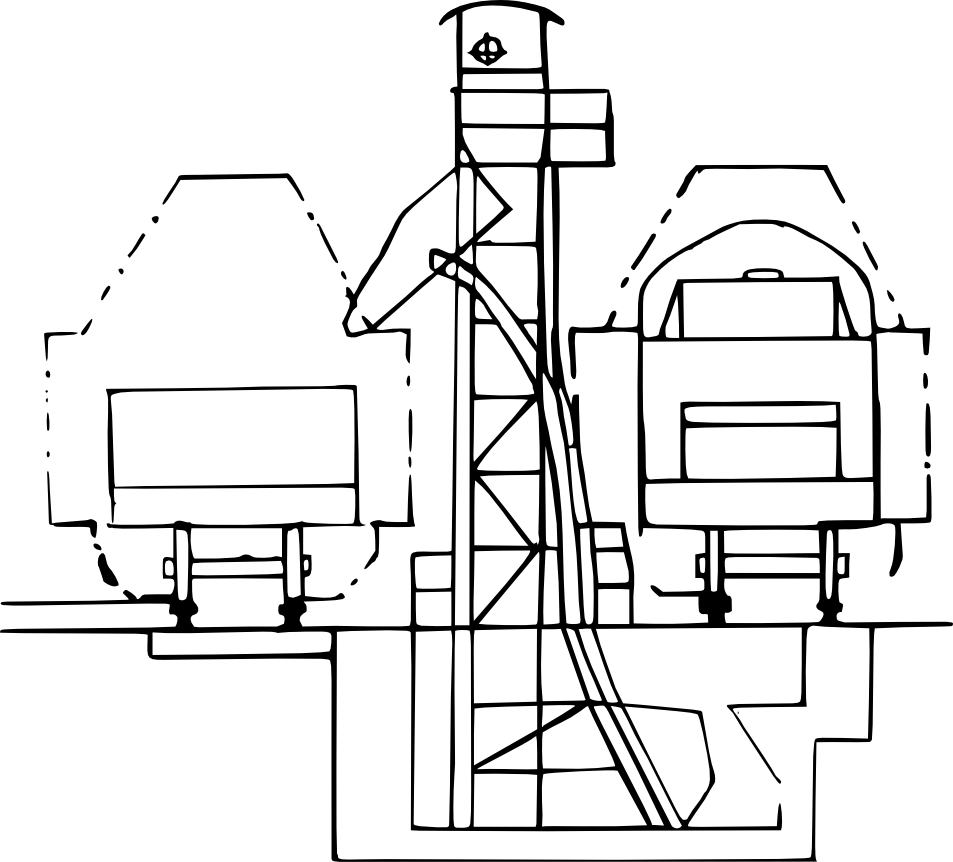
Diagram of an ashpit with hoist

Next to the coaling station there were often water cranes and works buildings. In addition, there were often store rooms for these facilities nearby.

==== Ashpits ====
At the ashpits, the grate, ashpan and smokebox of the steam locomotive were cleaned as part of its disposal routine after duties. The combustion of coal left behind about 20% of combustion residue. This was scraped off with various implements (scrapers, hooks and special brushes) and emptied into the ashpit (Schlackegrube or Schlackekanal) which were located on special ashpit tracks in the open. The ash and cinders were left in the pit until it was emptied. This was either carried out by hand or with a hoist (Schrägaufzug) (see photograph right). By this means, the ash was shovelled into trolleys, which were lifted and tipped into a wagon that then transport the ash away.

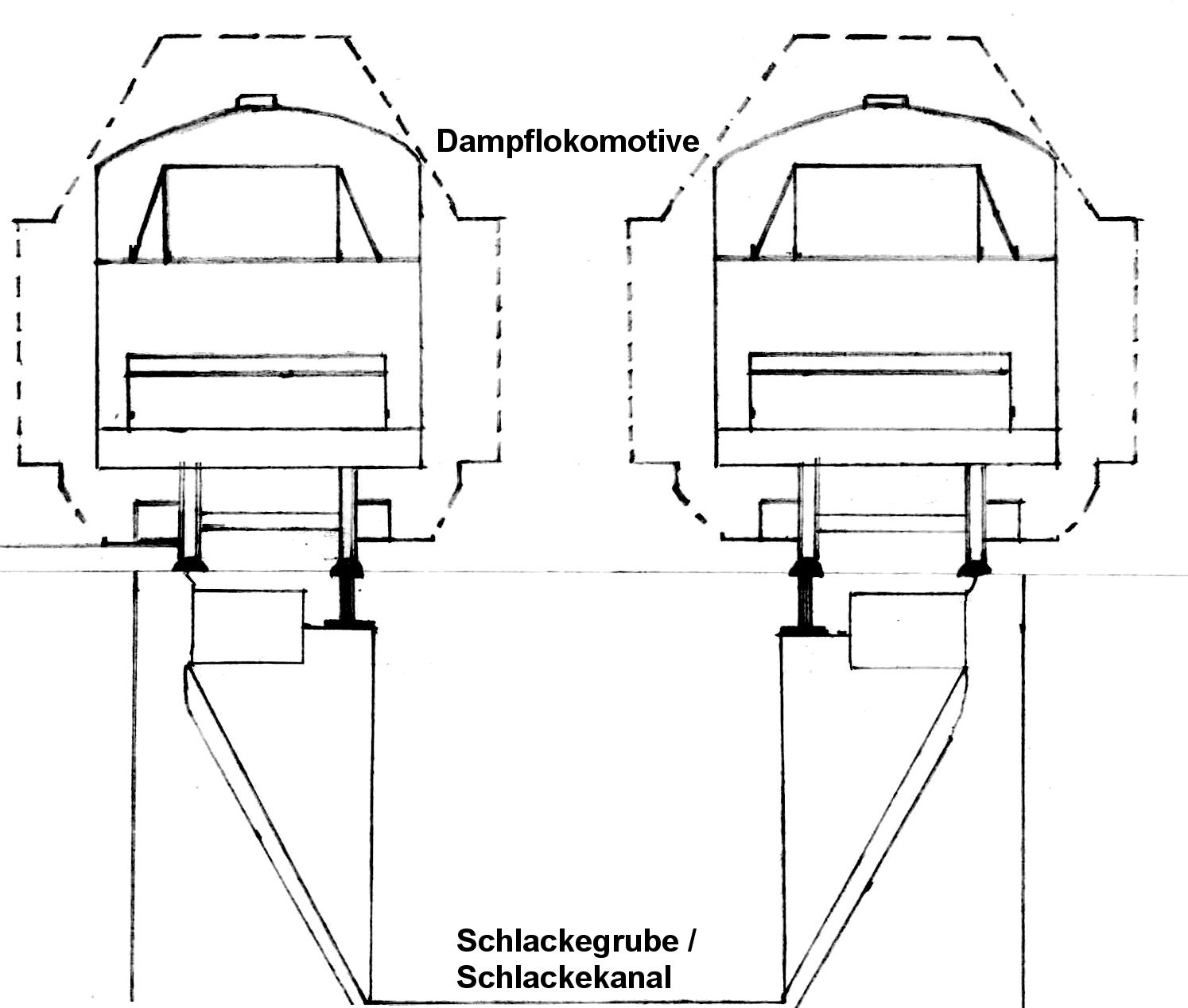
Diagram of an ashpit

==== Tube cleaning ====
During locomotive running, unburnt pieces of coal, ash and cinders lodged in the heating and smoke tubes, which therefore had to be cleaned out at specified intervals. Usually, this process took place every 500 to 1,000 kilometres. The tube cleaning equipment consisted of a mobile work platform and a compressed air pipe to blow through the heating and smoke tubes. For this activity, an employee (the tube cleaner) carried out this job on a designated siding. Cleaning all the tubes could take about an hour. A DR Class 01.5, for example, had 168 heating and smoke tubes.

==== Boiler washout points ====
The boiler of a steam locomotive had to be cleaned at regular intervals. Although boiler feedwater was thoroughly filtered, it contained a number of chemical compounds that did not fully evaporate. These compounds precipitated in due course as sludge and boiler scale, which could in time block the tubes or impede heat transfer within the boiler, leading to hazards in operating the engine. This meant that boilers had to be washed out regularly, either every ten to 14 days or after 2,000 kilometres for express locomotives and 1,500 kilometres on goods train locomotives. Cold washing a boiler took up to 14 hours. For hot washing, a special washout point was needed. For this purpose, locomotive sheds had a separate washout road with a washout channel. Every Bahnbetriebswerk had an additional washout road outside the shed. The used washing water drained into this channel and could be used for other purposes if need be.

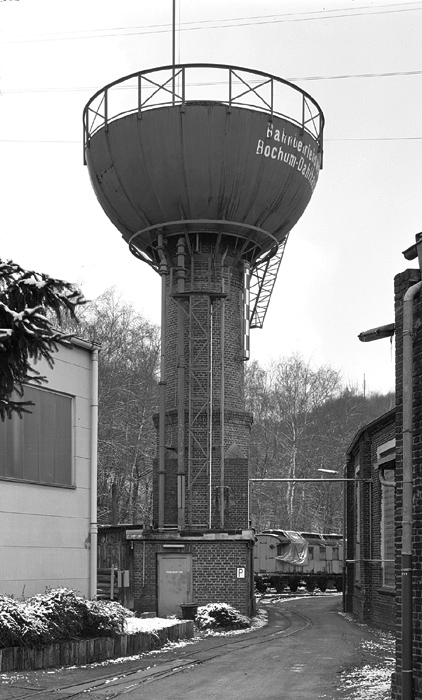
Water tower at Bochum-Dahlhausen Railway Museum

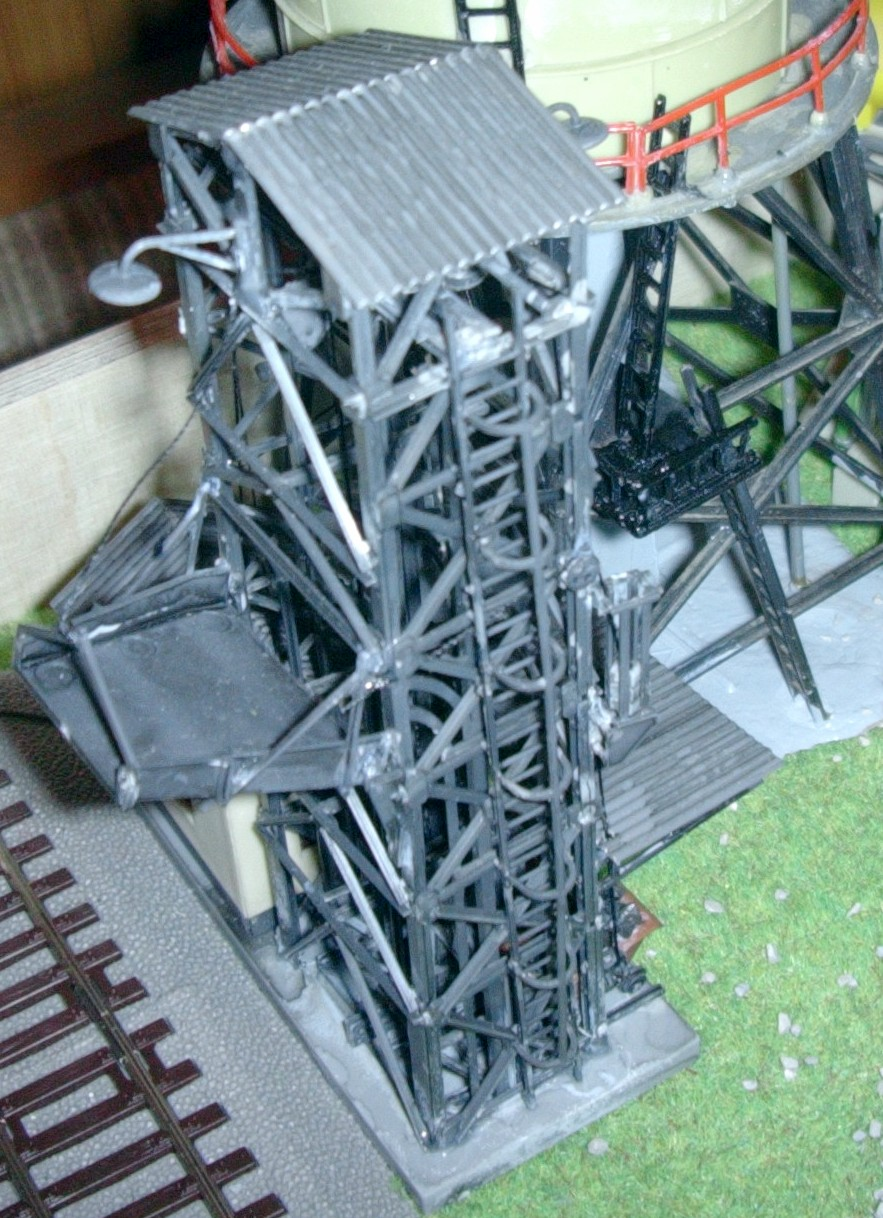
Model of a Schräg coaling facility

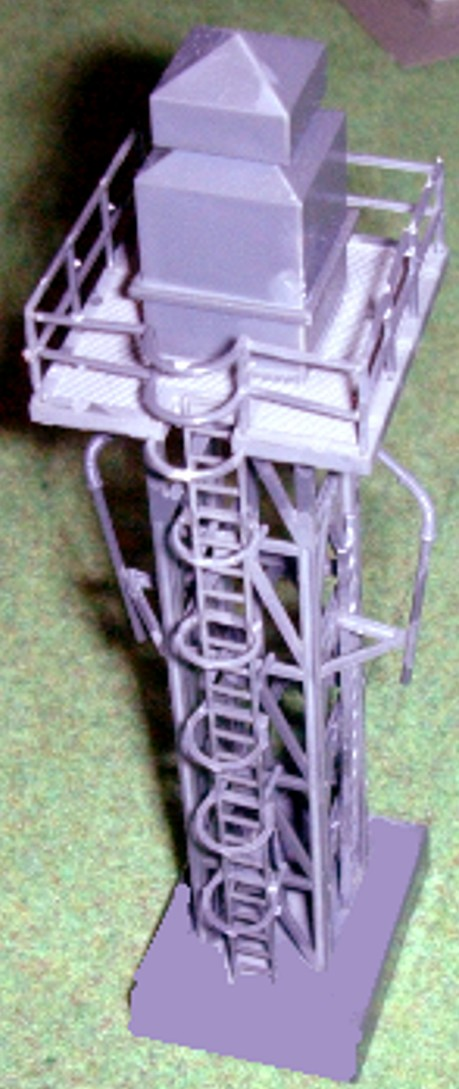
Model of a sanding tower

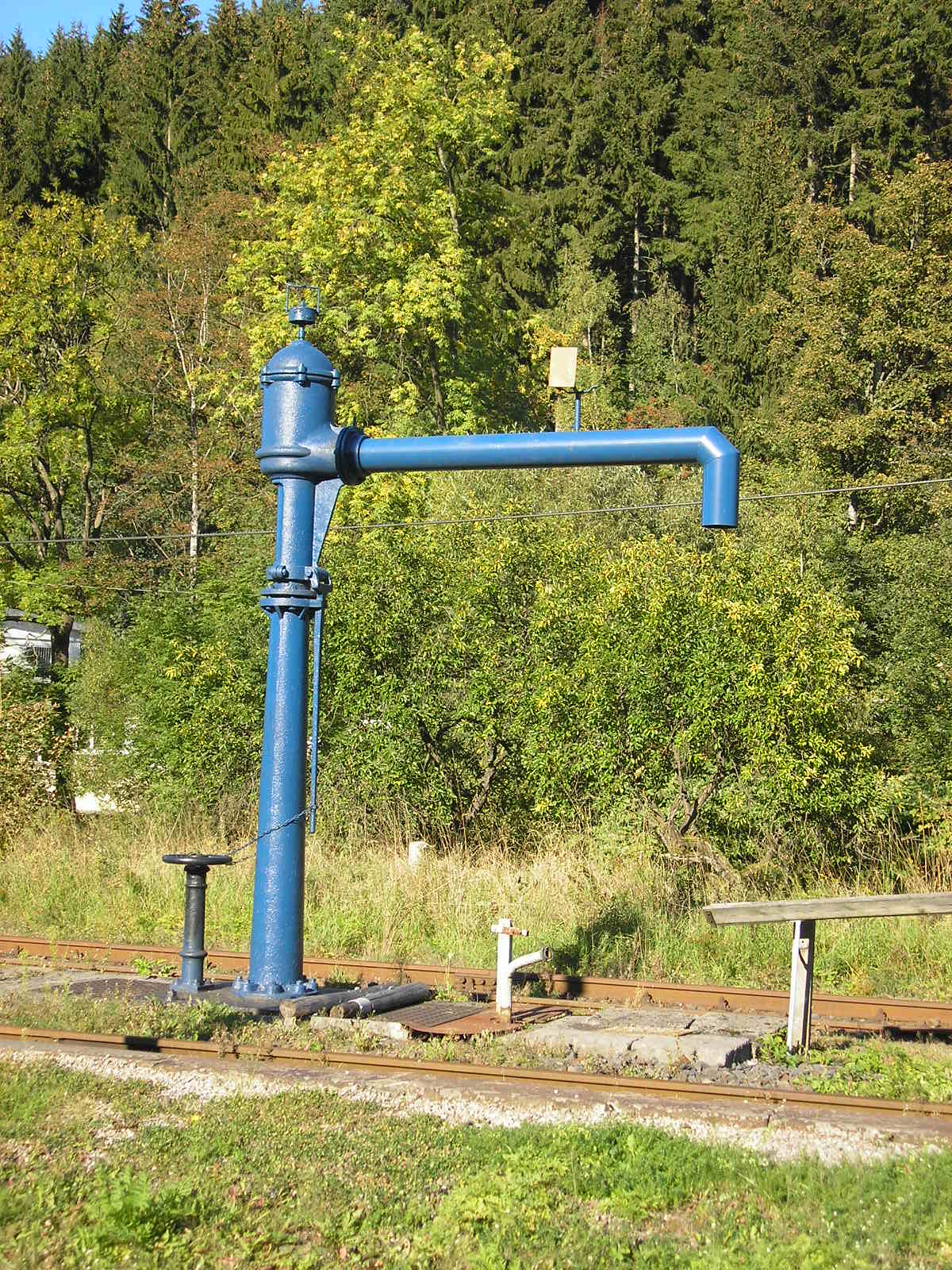
Water crane at Stützerbach

=== Engineering facilities ===
In addition to its running facilities, every Bahnbetriebswerk also had a large number of engineering facilities. These included, for example, traversers and turntables. Most important were the wheel drops. Usually located in the locomotive shed or the workshop, they facilitated changing the wheelsets. Initially there were many different wheel set designs until a standard type was developed. With the aid of a wheel drop, an axle could be replaced in just half an hour.

For smaller repair jobs, the workshops in a Bahnbetriebswerk had their own wheelset lathes. Higher than normal wear and tear on the tyres made it necessary to reprofile them ahead of scheduled overhauls. Each workshop was also equipped with a wide range of tools. At medium and large Bahnbetriebswerke, the workshop was divided into different departments. So there might have been a mechanical engineering workshop, a blacksmith's shop, a tool shop, a locksmith's shop, a foundry and an electrician's shop (this had little importance however). Moreover, in addition to the departments, sometimes there were several facilities for specialist tasks. For example, individual workshops like pump and boiler repairs might be established.

=== Other facilities ===
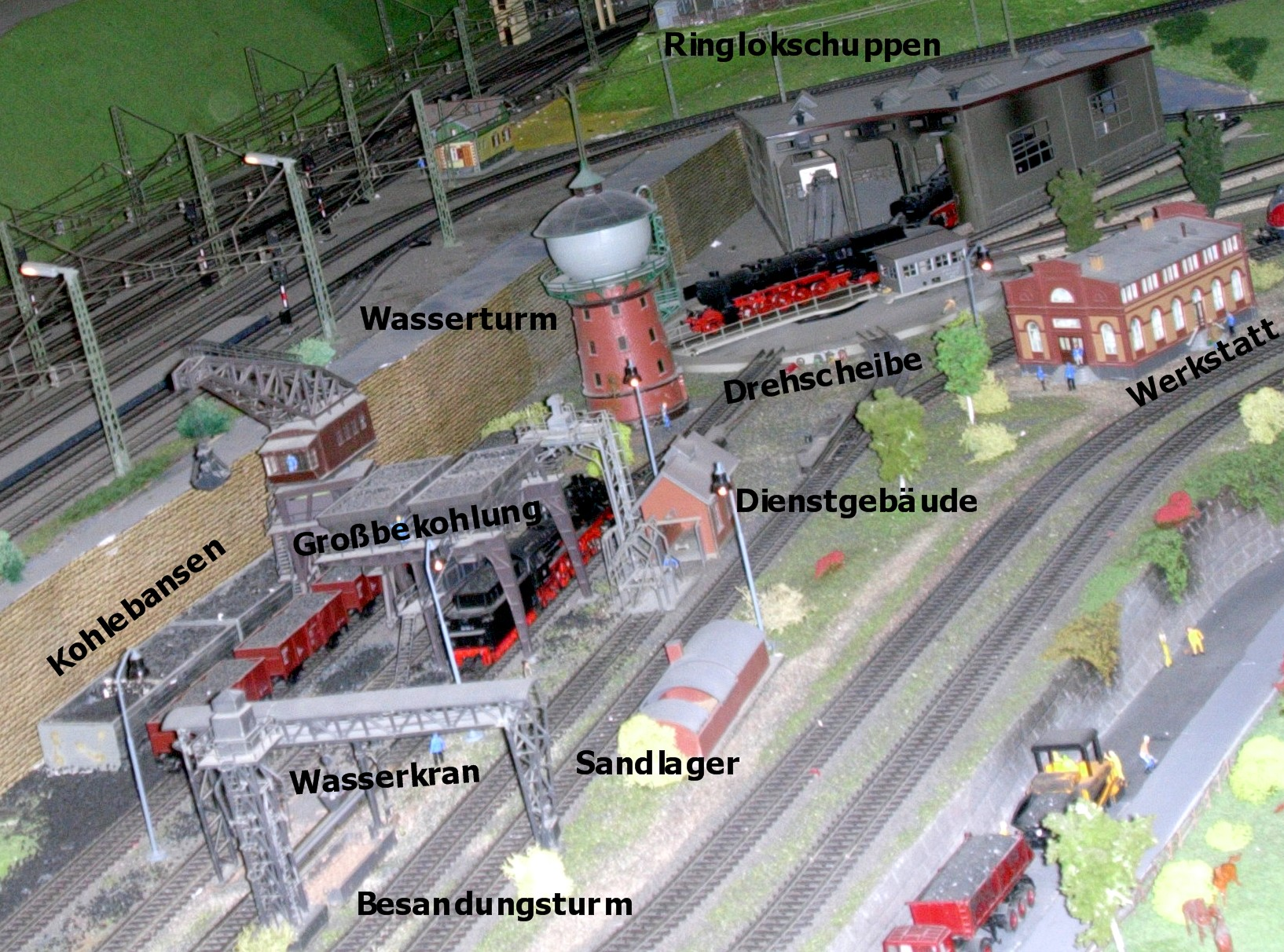
Model of a Bahnbetriebswerk

As well as the operational facilities, a Bahnbetriebswerk also had staff accommodation (showers and wash rooms, rest rooms for depot and locomotive staff, sleeping accommodation for locomotive crews and, in larger Bahnbetriebswerke a mess room too). Because Bahnbetriebswerke often had a lot of trackage, many were allocated their own signal box from which the various activities were controlled and directed. The locomotive shed itself was heated, so that the steam locomotives did not completely cool down, because otherwise it took too long to raise steam pressure.

== Management ==
=== Work groups ===
In order to optimise the pattern of work, individual functions were allocated to various groups of staff as follow:

- Group A: managerial functions (Verwaltungsangelegenheiten),
- Group B: locomotive running (Lokomotivbetriebsdienst),
- Group C: locomotive repair (Lokomotivausbesserung),
- Group D: wagon operations and repair (Wagenbetriebsdienst und Wagenausbesserung),
- Group E: engineering facilities (Maschinelle Anlagen),
- Group F: fuel and oil storage facilities (Betriebsstofflager) and
- Group K: motor transport (Kraftwagendienst).

This system was used by the Deutsche Bundesbahn as well as the Deutsche Reichsbahn, however the Reichsbahn had different names for the groups. The Austrian railways were organised in a similar way; here, too, the different tasks were divided up.

Group A: Managerial Functions

Group A was normally only found at larger Bahnbetriebswerke because there the managerial workload was the greatest. At smaller depots the shedmaster (Bahnbetriebswerkvorsteher) took on these tasks; medium-sized Betriebswerke the management functions were split between groups B and C. Group A had to draw up plans for the efficient running of the depot and for the allocation of locomotives. In addition they were responsible for the overall budget (awarding of fuel efficiency bonuses and payment of holiday and sickness pay). The management of operating records and locomotive cards (including mileages and fuel consumption of the rolling stock) as well as the oversight of energy consumption and the consumption of fuels (especially coal, water and gas) were also assigned to this group.

Group B: Locomotive Running

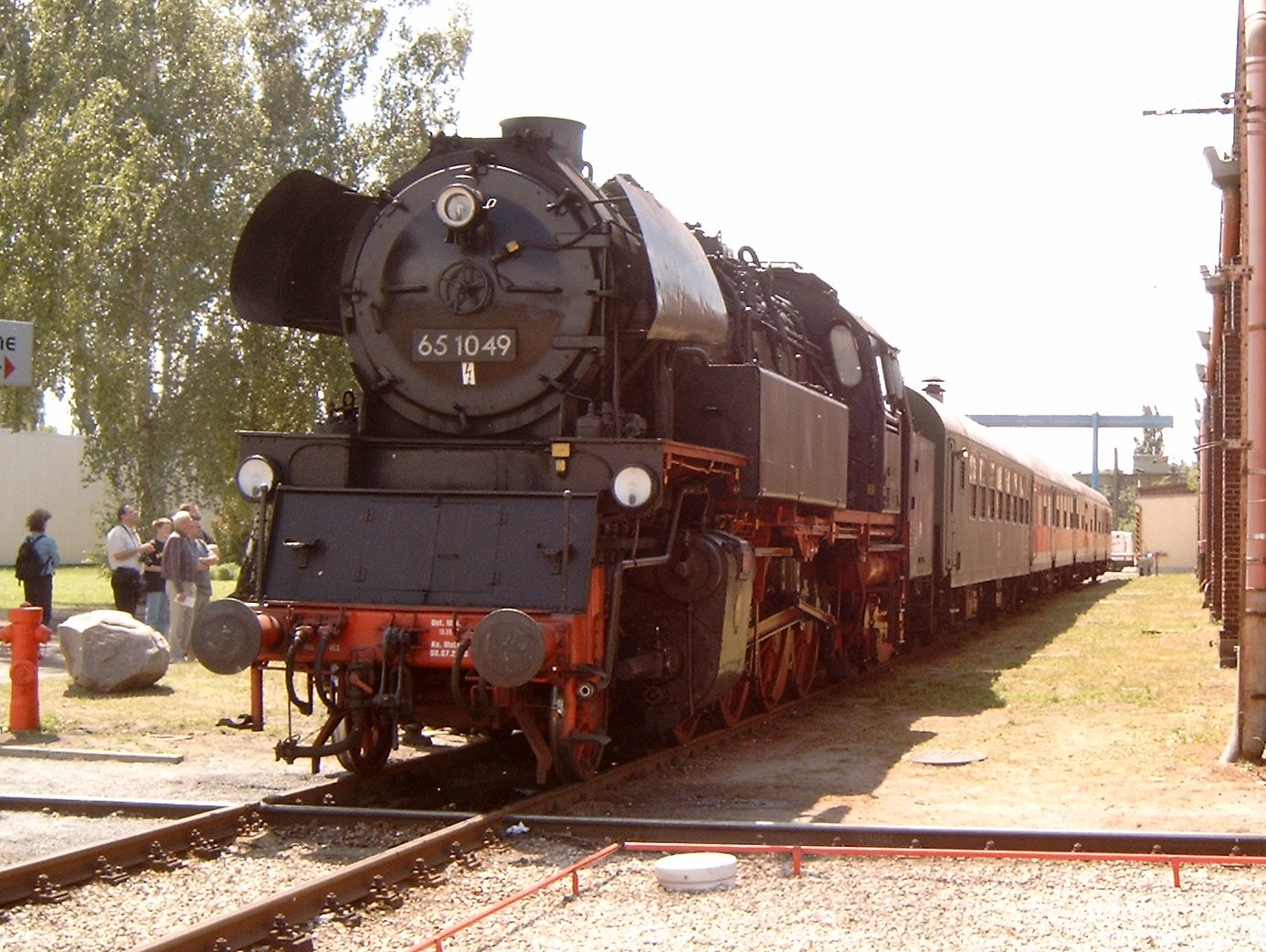
Locomotives, the responsibility of Groups B and C

Group B was responsible for the running of locomotives. At a large depot, they were headed by an inspector (Inspektor), who was usually also the deputy to the shedmaster (Dienstvorsteher), and who was supported by various assistants and running foremen (Lokdienstleiter). The majority of large Bahnbetriebswerke also had an outside running foreman and their own duty roster clerk (Diensteinteiler). Smaller Betriebswerke handed the functions of this group to the running foreman. Group B, which was referred to by the Deutsche Reichsbahn as Sektion Triebfahrzeug-Betrieb (locomotive running section), had to look after everything to do with locomotive and train running. Tasks assigned to this group included supervising locomotive operations, clearing defects and faults, drawing up locomotive diagrams and crew rosters, allocating staff and engines, checking locomotive records, training personnel, managing all documents and the care and supply of all engines (heating, coaling and cleaning). The drawing up of tasks, locomotive diagrams and crew rosters was later taken over by so-called 'technologists' (Technologen).

Group C: Locomotive Repair

The management of Group C – locomotive repair – also fell to a Reichsbahn inspector. He had the role of a mechanical foreman and was usually a deputy to the shedmaster. Several master tradesmen reported to him, depending on the size of the Betriebswerk. This group comprised several gangs of tradesmen (up to 30 employees) who in turn were led by various subordinate foremen. The Deutsche Reichsbahn also called this group the Abteilung Triebfahrzeug-Unterhaltung (locomotive maintenance department). Group C was responsible for carrying out repair and maintenance jobs, transferring damaged rolling stock to the main repair shops, ordering spare parts and materials including management of the spare parts store, monitoring new vehicle systems, keeping the breakdown train ready and recovering broken down vehicles.

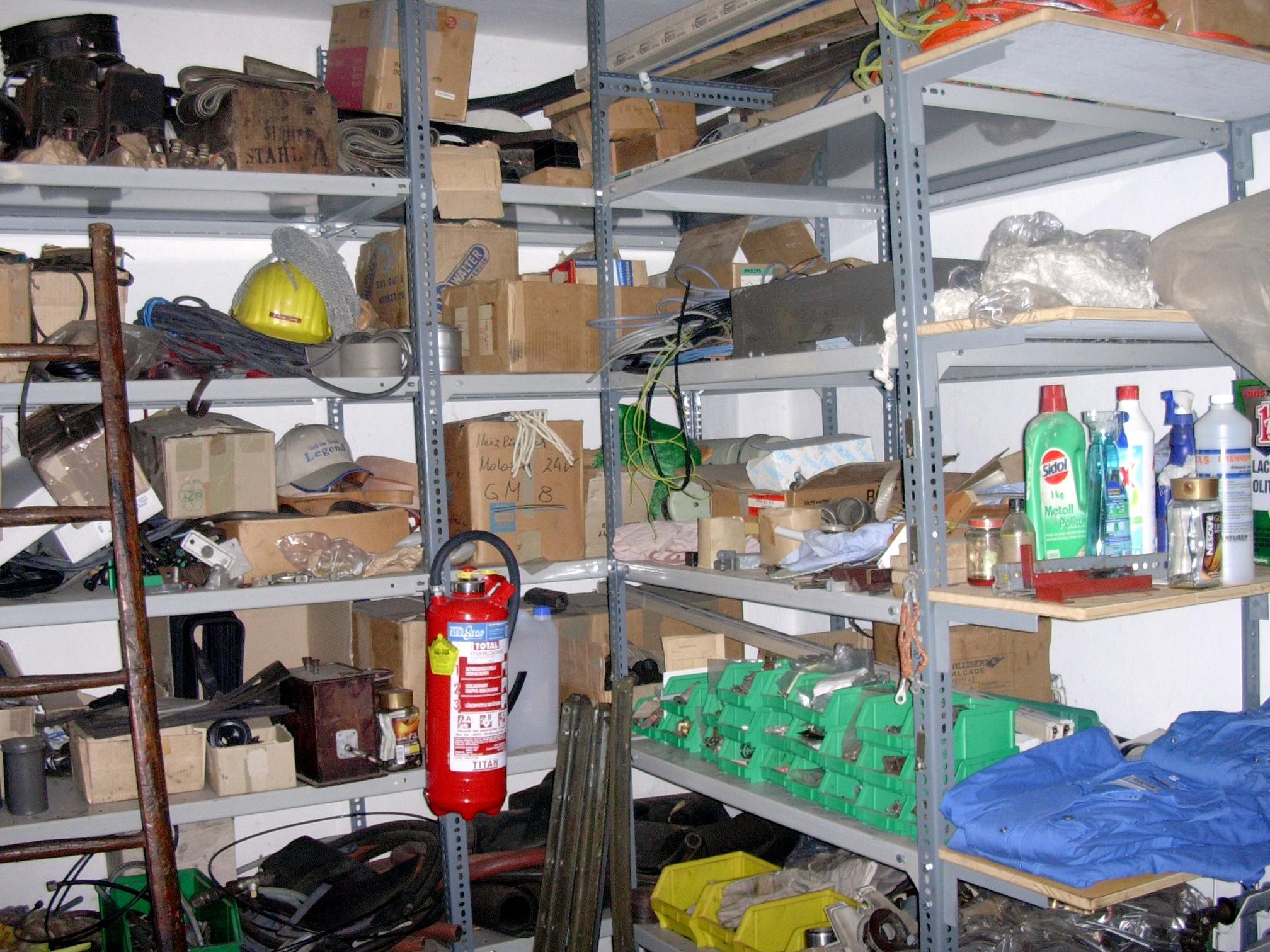
A store, the responsibility of Group D

Group D: Wagon operations and repair

Group D had a special role within the Betriebswerk and not every depot had such a department. Smaller Betriebswerke allocated these tasks to a master tradesman's gang in group C, that had a maximum of 40 staff. Both the DB and the DR during the 1950s established larger D groups at independent locations, known as Betriebswagenwerke or wagon depots. Where this was not the case, Group D was headed by another inspector to whom, depending on the size of the depot, up to three wagon foremen (Wagenmeister) reported. This group was responsible for checking reports of damage, repairing damage and defects, supervising the shunting foremen at stations, clearing up operational irregularities, refilling gas and disinfection facilities for wagons, cleaning, lighting and heating of wagons, maintenance and repair jobs, dispatching wagons to the main repair shops, ordering spare parts and materials for wagons, including the management of the spare parts and monitoring new systems on wagons.

Group E: Engineering Facilities

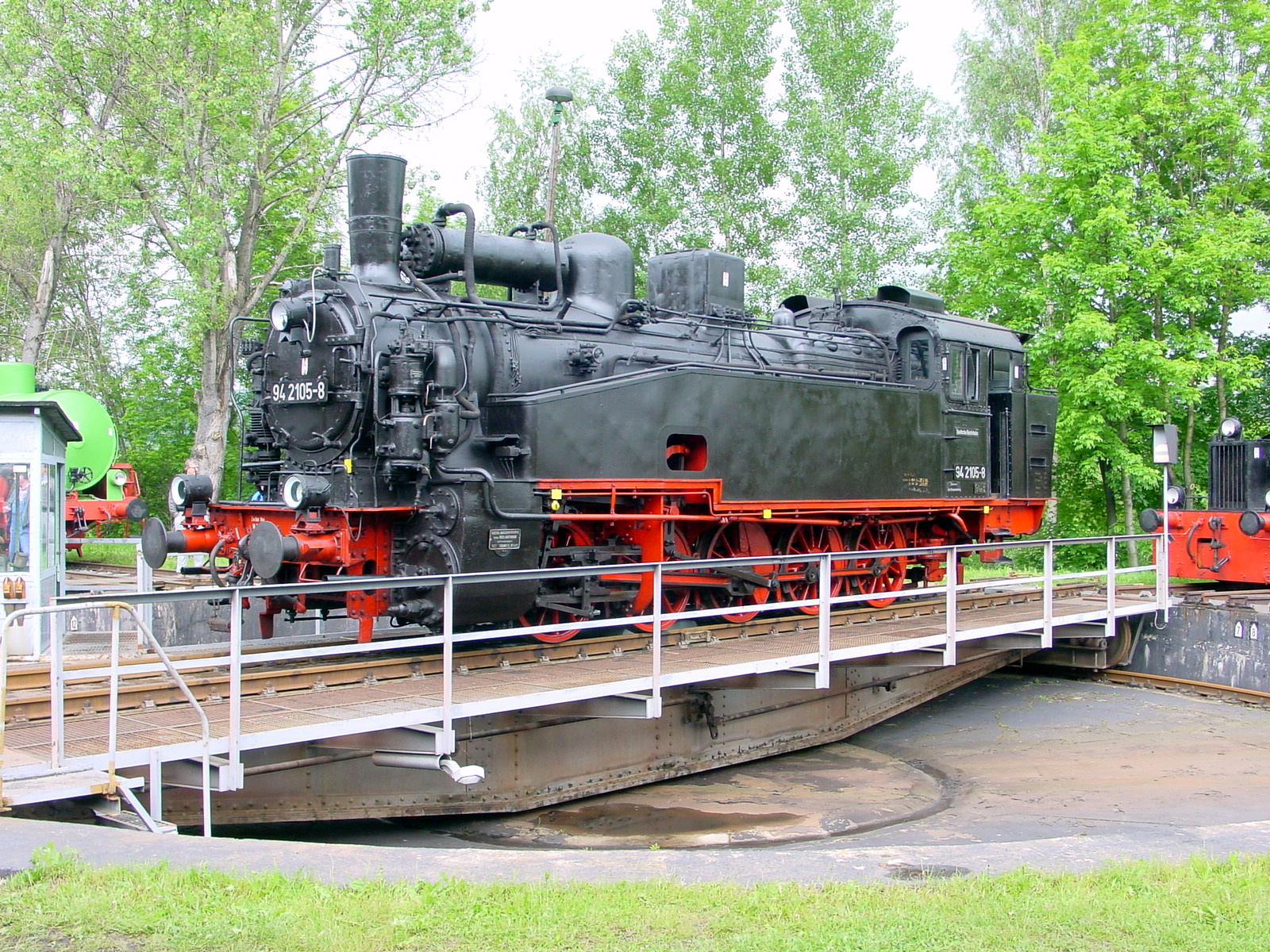
Engineering facilities, the purview of Group E

The composition of Group E depended on the size of the Bahnbetriebswerk. In the DR this group was called the Abteilung Technische Anlagen (Engineering Facilities department). In the Bundesbahn this department was further divided into two sub-groups. At medium-sized and large Bahnbetriebswerke the group was headed by a Reichsbahn inspector. At smaller depots, Group E comprised a maximum of 20 railwaymen - who mainly belonged to Group C. This group was crucial to ensuring smooth running operations. Their range of tasks included looking after the gas, water, steam and heating installations as well as coaling, sanding and loading stations (cranes, turntables, and traversers also fell into their area of responsibility), maintaining the electrical installations, weighbridges and track brakes, ordering spare parts and materials including management of the spares store and the instruction and control of the machine operators.

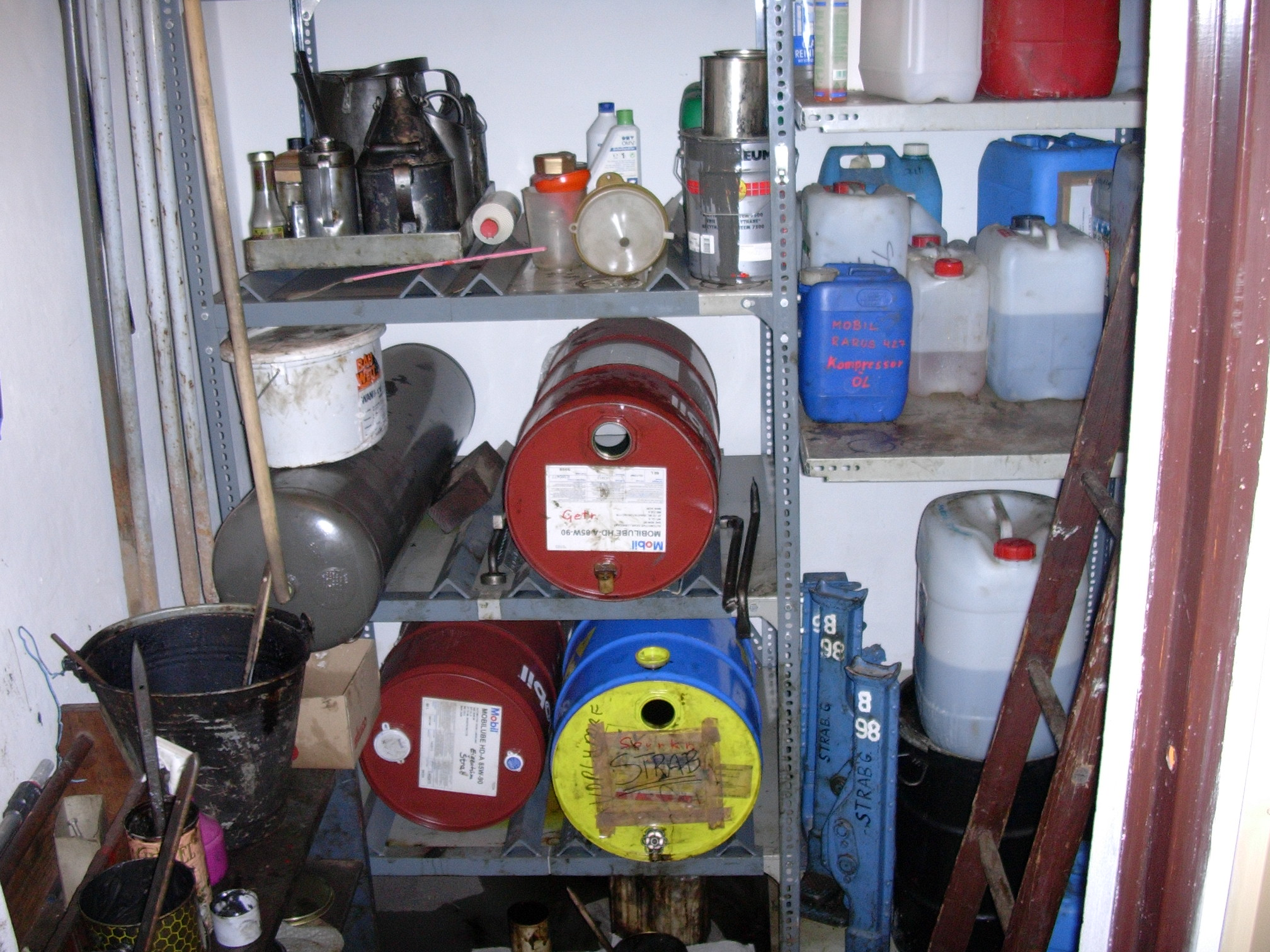
A small fuel and oil store (Group F)

Group F: Fuel and Oil Storage Large Betriebswerke had their own department responsible for the fuel stores - Group F. Smaller depots allocated this work to Group A. Amongst the tasks allotted to Group F were the ordering and stocking of fuel supplies and equipment, management of the equipment records (a type of inventory register), the storage of fuel and control of the stores personnel.

Group K: Motor Transport

Group K was formed in the 1930s and only at a few Bahnbetriebswerke. In the 1950s the DB and DR hived them off and they finally ended up in the so-called Kraftwagenbetriebswerke (KBW, KBw) or vehicle depots. Group K was run by a Reichsbahn inspector and had the job of tasking and maintaining motor vehicles, sending them to the main workshops (Ausbesserungswerke), controlling and managing their fuel stores and drivers.

=== Personnel ===
The staff of a Bahnbetriebswerk comprised a shedmaster (Dienstvorsteher), the supervisory staff (Aufsichtsbeamten), the running staff (Betriebsbeamten), the tradesmen (Handwerkern), the depot workers (Betriebsarbeitern) and the managerial staff (Verwaltungsangestellten). The person in charge of a Bahnbetriebswerk was the shedmaster – he usually had a mechanical engineering background and was an engineer. At smaller facilities it was often the case that the senior engine driver ran the depot. The shedmaster had to select the staff and conduct examinations. In addition he was in charge of safety in a way, because he had to monitor all safety and working regulations; he was also responsible for the cleanliness of the Betriebswerk. Because almost all shedmasters had had engine driver training, they had to help out when there was a high traffic loading. The shedmaster had to be present at all serious accidents or other major events.

== See also ==
- List of locomotive depots in Germany
- Ausbesserungswerk
- Bahnbetriebswerk
- Motive power depot
- Roundhouse

== Literature ==
- Großkopf, Volker; Rohde, Dirk; Tiedtke, Markus (2001). Bahnbetriebswerke Teil 1, Kleine Lokstationen (in German). Vol. Eisenbahn-Journal Anlagenplanung 2/2001. Fürstenfeldbruck: Verlagsgruppe Bahn GmbH. ISBN 3-89610-073-4.
- Großkopf, Volker; Rohde, Dirk; Tiedtke, Markus (2002). Bahnbetriebswerke. Teil 2: Mittelgroße Lokstationen (in German). Vol. Eisenbahn-Journal Anlagenplanung 4/2002. Fürstenfeldbruck: Verlagsgruppe Bahn GmbH. ISBN 3-89610-102-1.
- Kratzsch-Leichsering, Michael U.; Endisch, Dirk (1999). Die Dampflok im Bahnbetriebswerk (in German). Stuttgart: Transpress. ISBN 3-613-71096-X.
- Reiners, Jan (2006). So funktioniert das Bahnbetriebswerk (in German). Stuttgart: Transpress. ISBN 3-613-71279-2.
- Rohde, Dirk; Tiedtke, Markus (2003). Bahnbetriebswerke. Teil 3: Große Lokstationen (in German). Vol. Eisenbahn-Journal Anlagenplanung 4/2003. Fürstenfeldbruck: Verlagsgruppe-Bahn GmbH. ISBN 3-89610-116-1.
- Rohde, Dirk; Tiedtke, Markus (2004). Bahnbetriebswerke Teil 4: Groß-Bw (in German). Vol. Eisenbahn-Journal Anlagenplanung 4/2004. Fürstenfeldbruck: Verlagsgruppe Bahn GmbH. ISBN 3-89610-129-3.
- Tiedtke, Markus. Bahnbetriebswerke. Teil 1: Bekohlung und Besandung (in German). Vol. EK-Special 19. Freiburg: EK-Verlag GmbH.
- Tiedtke, Markus. Bahnbetriebswerke. Teil 2: Wasser marsch (in German). Vol. EK-Special 24. Freiburg: EK-Verlag GmbH.
- Tiedtke, Markus. Bahnbetriebswerke. Teil 3: Drehscheiben und Lokschuppen (in German). Vol. EK-Special 34. Freiburg: EK-Verlag GmbH.
- Weikelt, Walter; Teufel, Manfred (2005) [Nachdruck der Ausgabe Berlin 1962]. Die Technologie der Ausbesserung der Dampflokomotiven (in German). Stuttgart: Transpress. ISBN 3-613-71256-3.
