= Grand Trunk Western Railroad Grand Haven Coal Tipple =

- U.S. National Register of Historic Places
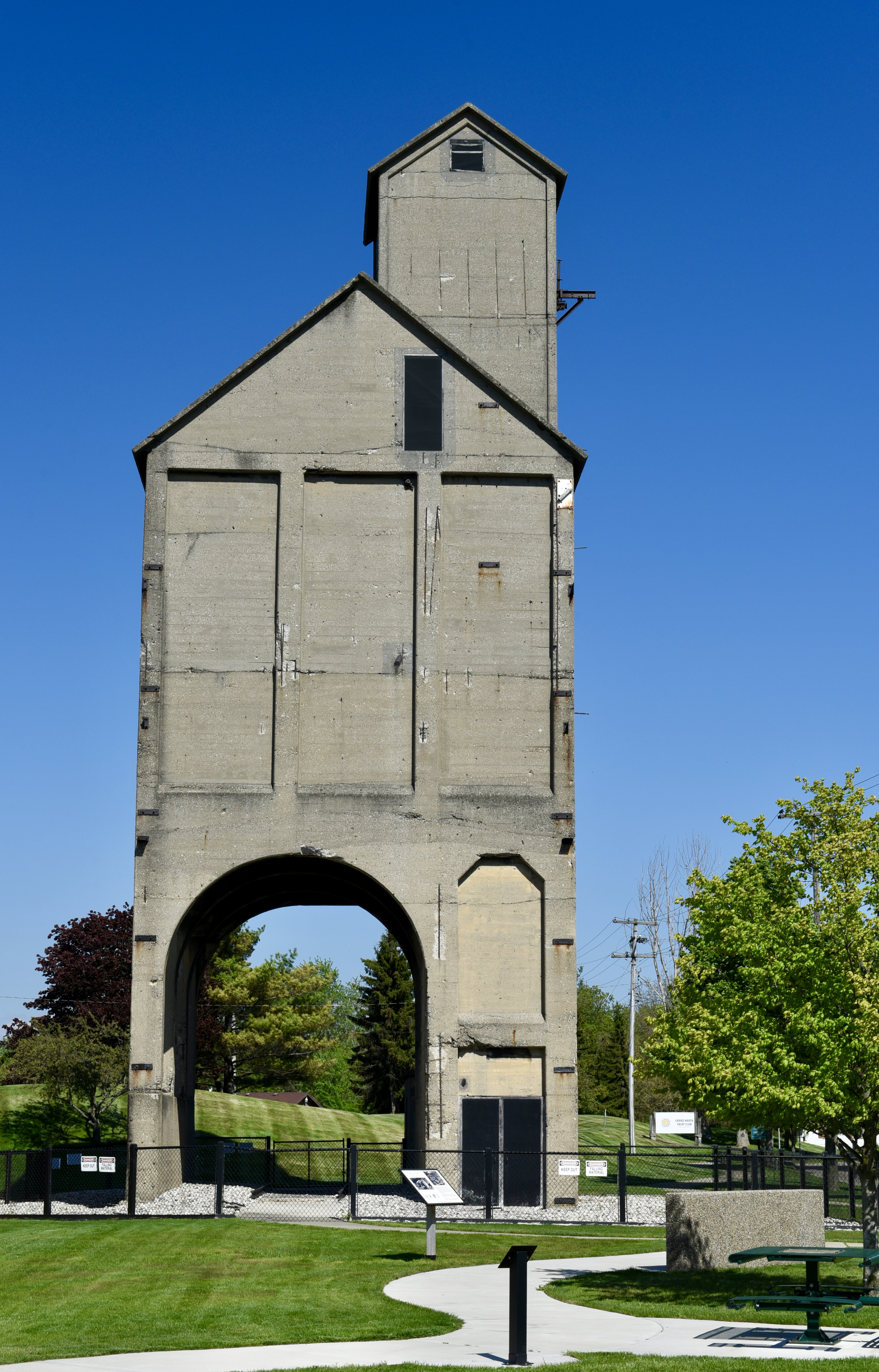

- Location within Michigan Location within the United States
- Interactive map
- Location: 300 Block of N. Harbor Dr. in Chinook Pier Park; Grand Haven, Michigan
- Coordinates: 43°4′5″N 86°13′51″W
- Built: 1925
- NRHP reference No.: 16000583
- Added to NRHP: September 6, 2016

The Grand Trunk Western Railroad Grand Haven Coal Tipple is a coaling tower designed to feed coal to steam locomotives located on the 300 block of North Harbor Drive (in Chinook Pier Park) in Grand Haven, Michigan. It is the tallest structure in the city. The coal tipple was listed on the National Register of Historic Places in 2016.

== History ==
In 1869, the Detroit, Grand Haven and Milwaukee Railway purchased the river frontage at this location and placed their operations at this site. structures located here included a turntable, a grain elevator, an engine house, a freight warehouse, an icehouse, a depot, and a water tank. The railway underwent a series of mergers, and was eventually obtained by the Grand Trunk Western Railroad, although the subsidiary retained an independent identity. In 1902, the railroad began car ferry service at this site. In 1924-25, the railroad upgraded its Grand Haven facilities, building a 50,000 gallon water tower and this coaling station.

When in use, the structure contained a hoist that provided coal to locomotives through the two steel chutes projecting from the structure. An electric motor in the adjacent engine house powered the system. In 1933, Grand Trunk Railroad transferred its ferry service to Muskegon in 1933, the coal tipple fell into disuse. In 1949, the ferry dock in Muskegon collapsed and Grand Trunk briefly re-activated the site. However, diesels replaced steam locomotives in the 1950s and no further operations took place at the tower. The steel hardware was eventually removed. Grand Trunk ceased passenger operations to Grand Haven in 1955, and in 1975 it ended freight service and abandoned the track.

== Description ==
The Grand Trunk Western Railroad Grand Haven Coal Tipple is a massive structure built from reinforced concrete, standing 79 feet high and covering an area 38 feet by 30 feet. The structure includes a large coal storage section along with a small gabled unit above that at one time housed the hoist machinery. Adjacent to the main structure is small single-story reinforced concrete power house building. Also located in the park is the Pere Marquette Railway Locomotive No. 1223, separately listed on the National Register.

The first floor of the coal tipple is constructed from ten concrete piers that define three bays on the longer sides and two on the shorter. The bays are composed of arches running from pier to pier. Some bays are entirely open, while others are filled with a concrete panel. A wide horizontal concrete belt course above the arches defines the base of the structure's second level. This level has bays aligned with those on the first story, with all containing recessed rectangular planes without windows. This level originally contained coal storage. The wider central bay continues upward to form a third story with a gabled concrete roof.
