= Locomotive winch =

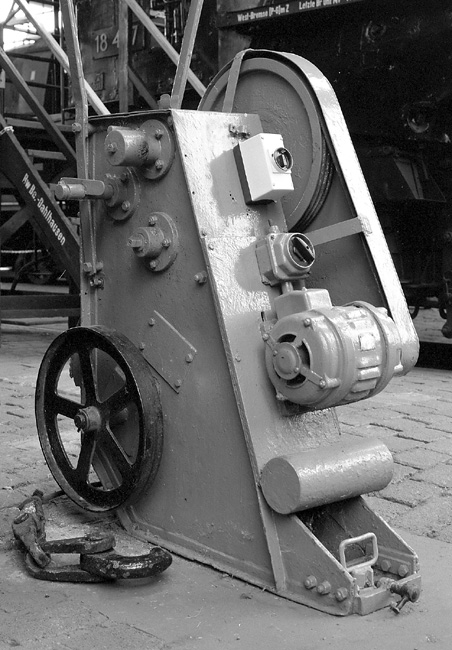
Electric locomotive winch at Bochum-Dahlhausen Railway Museum

A locomotive winch is a technical device for moving stabled railway locomotives.

These could be broken down diesel or electric locomotives, but also 'cold' steam locomotives that have been stabled or stored in a locomotive shed. It was particularly important in the case of the latter category because the firing up of a steam locomotive from cold took several hours. As a result, in Germany, locomotive winches could be found in almost all steam locomotive sheds (Bahnbetriebswerk). They were usually electrically operated. Using pulleys, they could be used to pull locomotives on tracks other than the one on which they were installed.

== Literature ==
- Walter Weikelt / Manfred Teufel: Die Technologie der Ausbesserung der Dampflokomotiven, transpress Verlag, ISBN 3-613-71256-3

== See also ==
- Bahnbetriebswerk (steam locomotive)
- Bahnbetriebswerk
- Motive power depot
- Capstan (nautical)
