= Tube cleaning (locomotive) =

Tube cleaning is the process whereby the boiler tubes of steam locomotives are cleaned out, removing soot and ash in order to ensure the effective generation of draught for the fire. This was often done with steam lances or compressed air and accompanied by brushing as required.

== United Kingdom ==
During the 1930s some UK locomotives were fitted with steam operated tube-cleaning guns, sometimes referred to as anti-carbonisers. It was possible to direct sand, under steam pressure, to any part of the rear tube plate from a lever in the cab.

== Germany ==
In Germany too, locomotive sheds often had tube cleaning equipment (Rohrblasgerüst) which was used to blow through the boiler tubes. This tube cleaning, carried out by a steam lance, had to be done once a week. Residue left in the fire and smoke tubes not only reduced the transfer of heat from the hot smoke gases to the water in the boiler, but also accelerated corrosion of the tubes.

== See also ==
- Steam locomotive
- Boiler
- Bahnbetriebswerk (steam)

== Literature ==
Ransome-Wallis, P. (2001) [1959]. Illustrated Encyclopedia of World Railway Locomotives. Dover Publications, Inc. ISBN 0-486-41247-4.
