= Coaling tower =

Facility used to load coal into steam locomotives

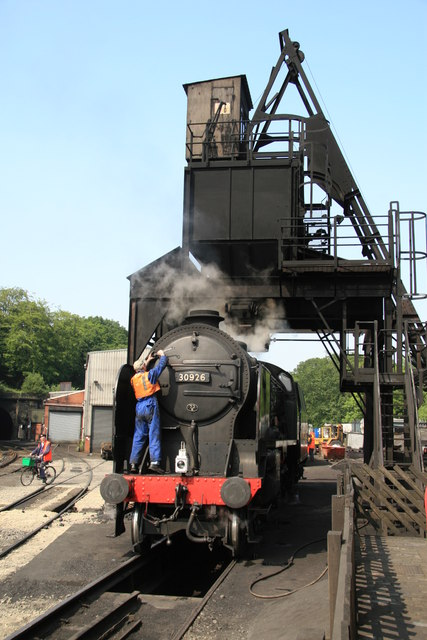
A steel coal tower at Grosmont Motive Power Depot, United Kingdom, 2007

A coaling tower, coal stage, coaling plant or coaling station is a facility used to load coal as fuel into railway steam locomotives. Coaling towers were often sited at motive power depots or locomotive maintenance shops.

In the early years of railways, coal was shovelled by hand into locomotive tenders. The first attempt in Britain to replace manual labour by gravity in the refuelling process was at Shildon, County Durham, where coal drops were built by the Stockton and Darlington Railway in 1847.

In time, railway companies constructed more elaborate coaling towers, made from wood, steel, or reinforced concrete (ferroconcrete). In almost all cases, coaling stations used a gravity-fed method, with one or more large storage bunkers for the coal elevated on columns above the railway tracks, from which the coal could be released to slide down a chute into the waiting locomotive's coal storage area.

The method of lifting the bulk coal into the storage bin varied. The coal was sometimes dropped from a hopper car into a pit below tracks adjacent to the tower. From the pit a conveyor-type system used a chain of motor-driven buckets to raise the coal to the top of the tower where it would be dumped into the storage bin. A skip-hoist system sometimes lifted a single large bin for the same purpose. Some facilities lifted entire railway coal trucks or wagons and tipped their contents into the hopper. Sanding pipes were often mounted on coaling towers to allow simultaneous replenishment of the sand box on a locomotive.

During the 1950s and 1960s, as railways in many countries replaced steam with diesel and electric traction, the need for coaling towers declined, and eventually vanished completely. Of the more than 100 ferroconcrete examples built in Britain, those at Immingham and Carnforth were the final two left standing, the former being demolished in 2018. The Carnforth coaling tower, built by the London, Midland and Scottish Railway in 1939, is a Grade II* listed building. In the United States, many reinforced concrete towers remain in place if they do not interfere with operations, due to the high cost of demolition incurred with such massive structures.

== Gallery ==
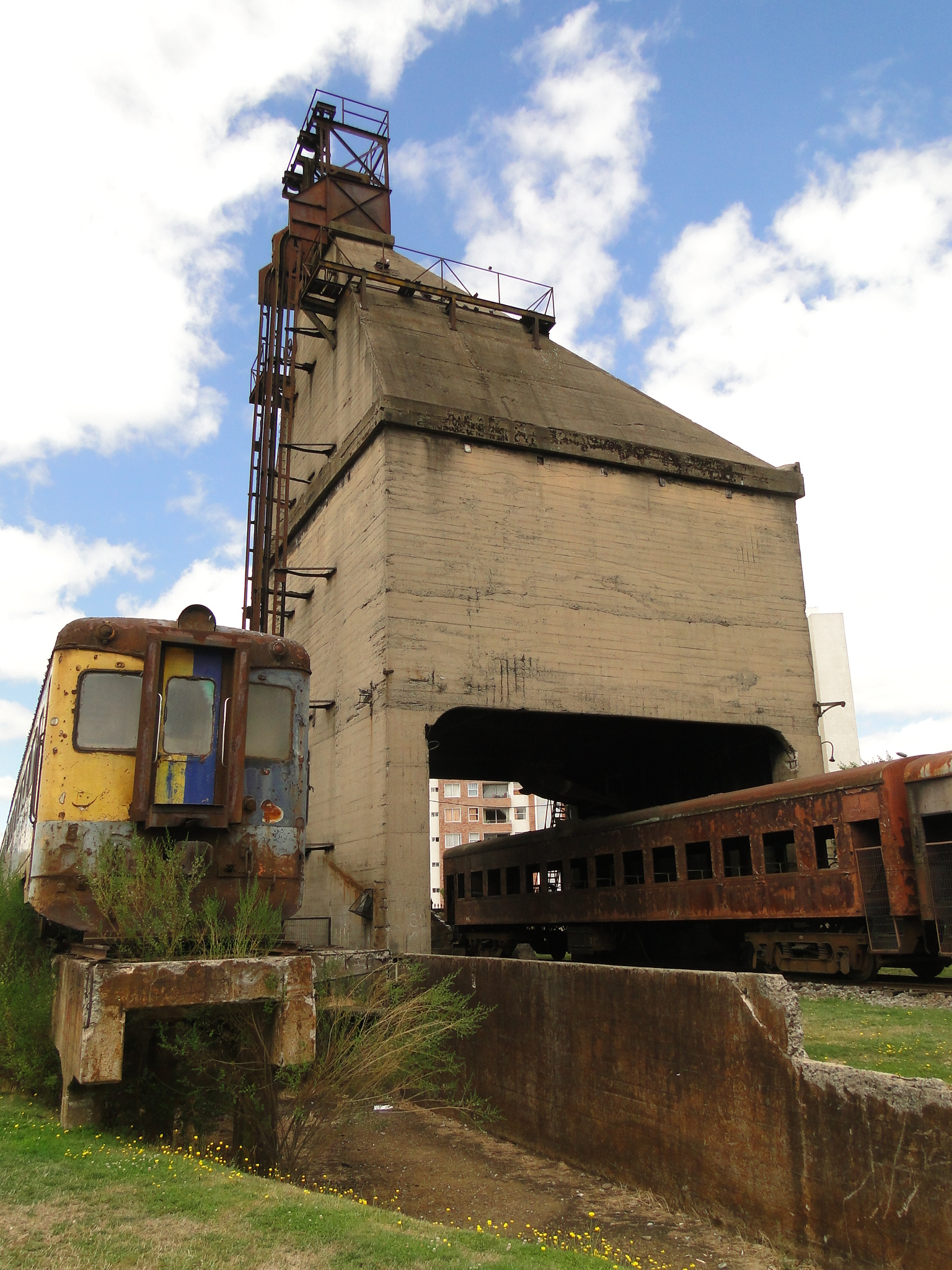
Temuco, Chile, 2012

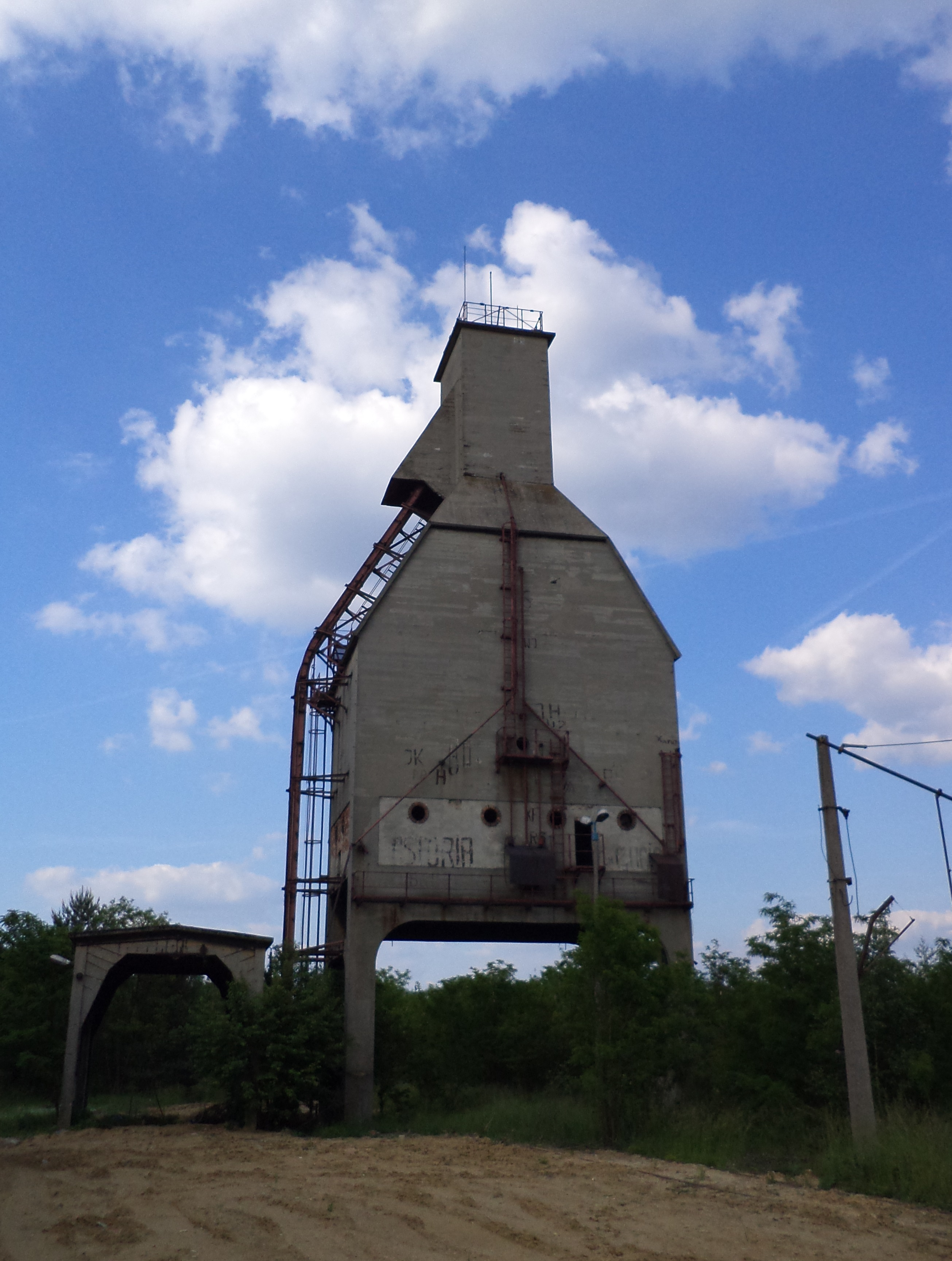
Tarnowskie Góry, Poland, 2016

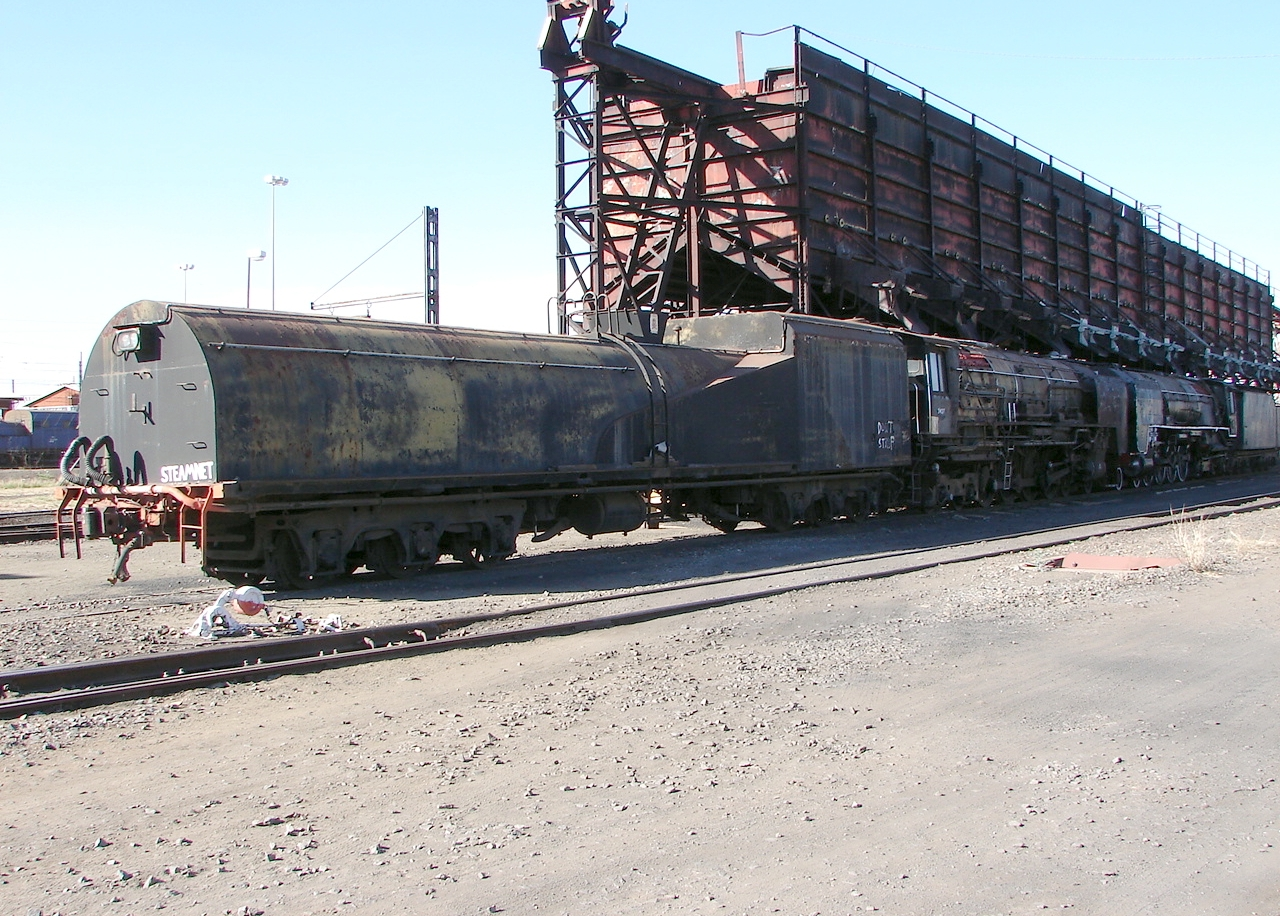
SAR Class 25NC 3437 (4-8-4) at the coal stage at Beaconsfield, South Africa, 2009

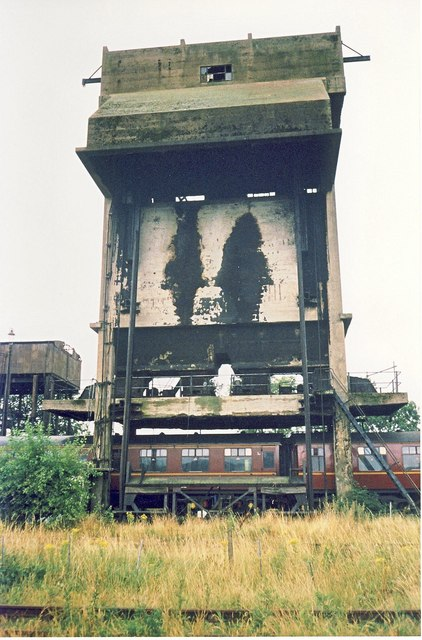
Carnforth, United Kingdom, 1999

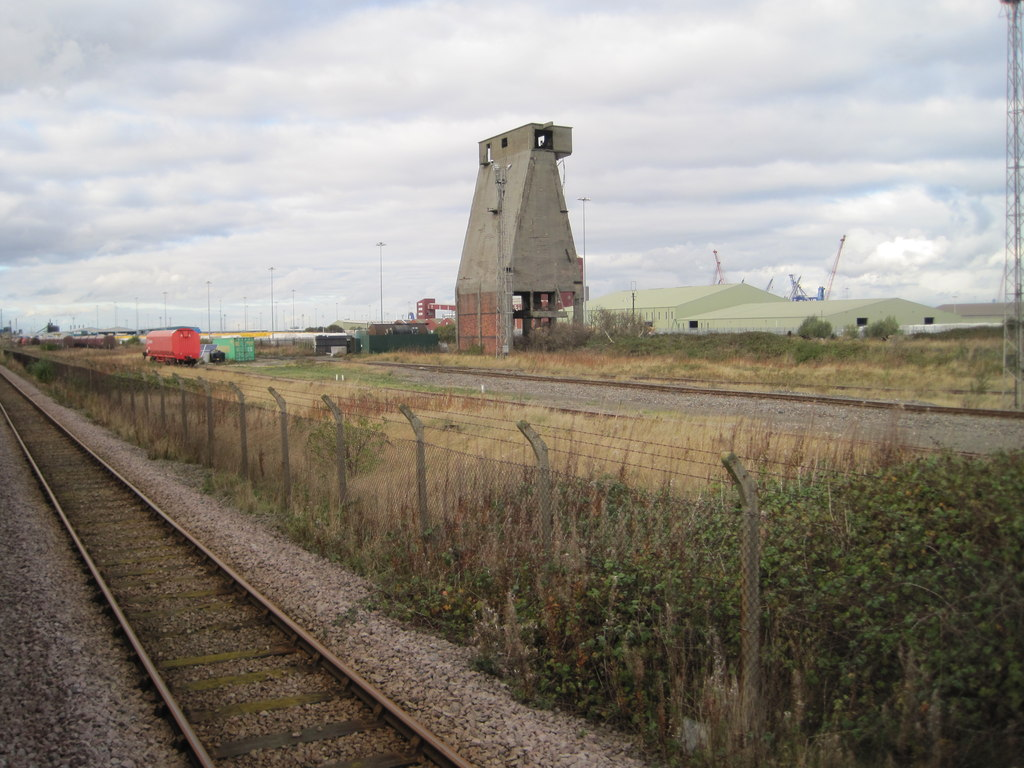
Immingham, United Kingdom, 2013

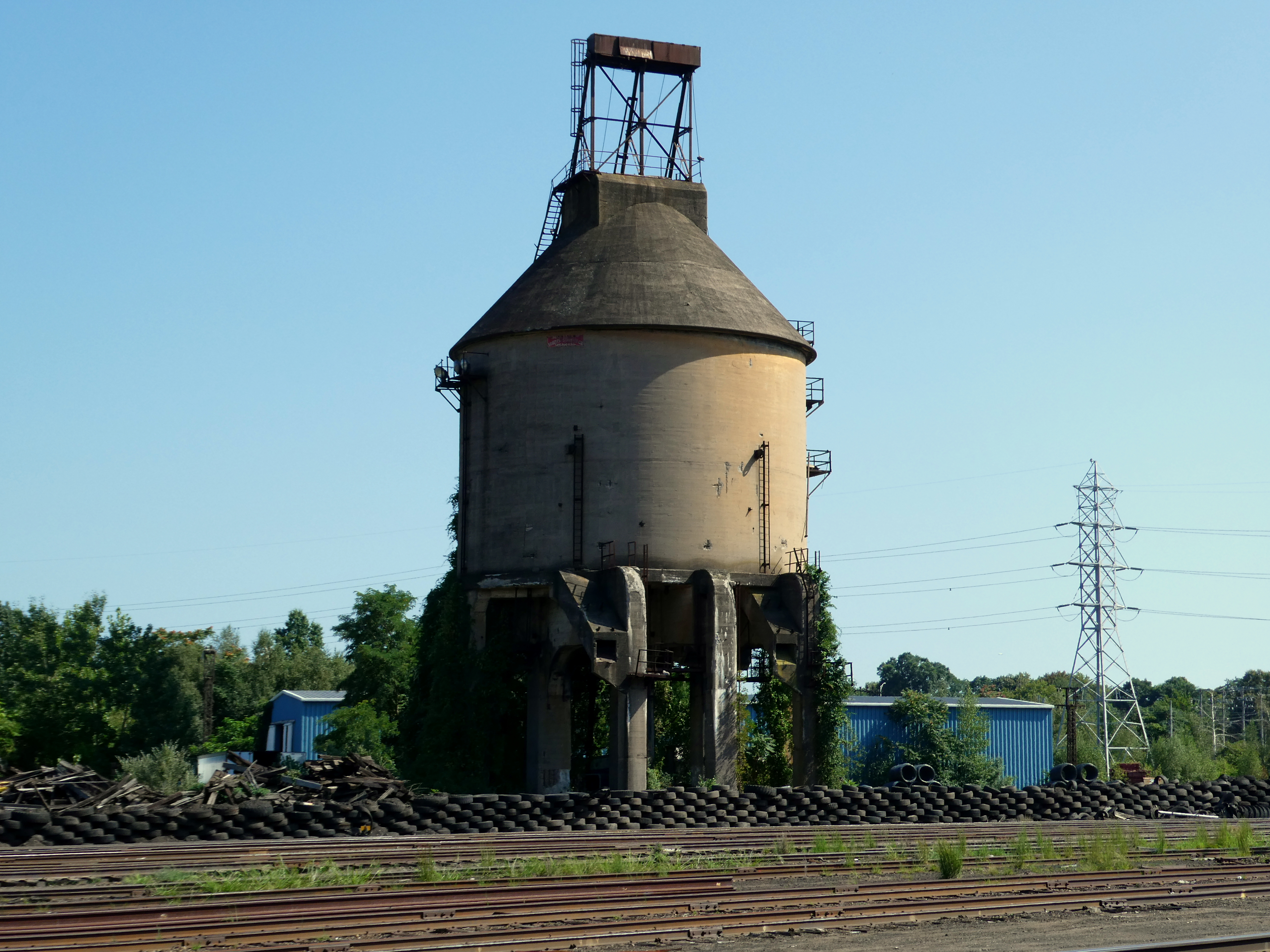
Cedar Hill Yard, Connecticut, 2022

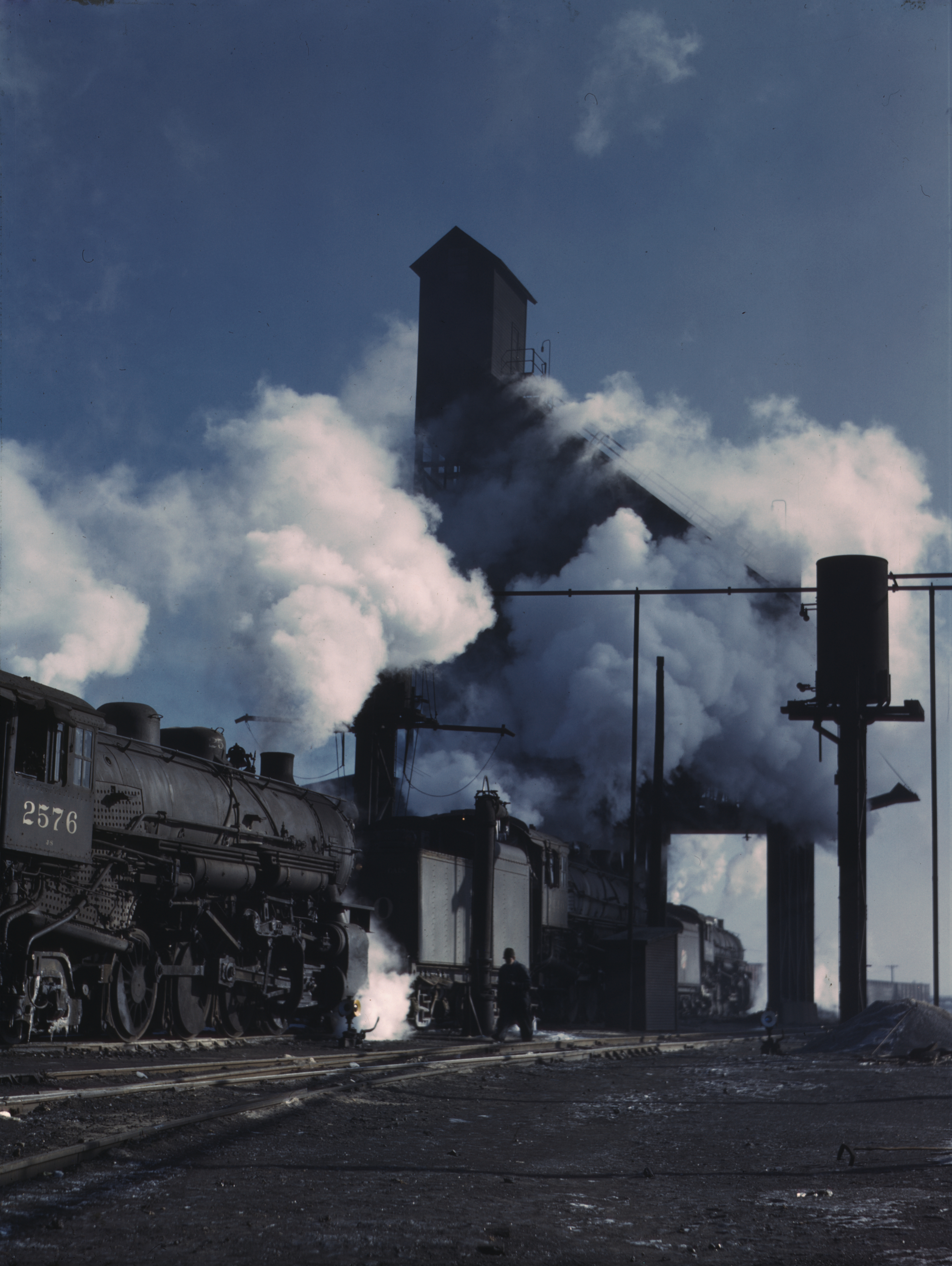
Locomotive 2576 over the ash pit at the roundhouse and coaling station, now demolished, at the Chicago and Northwestern Railroad yards, Chicago, Illinois, December 1942

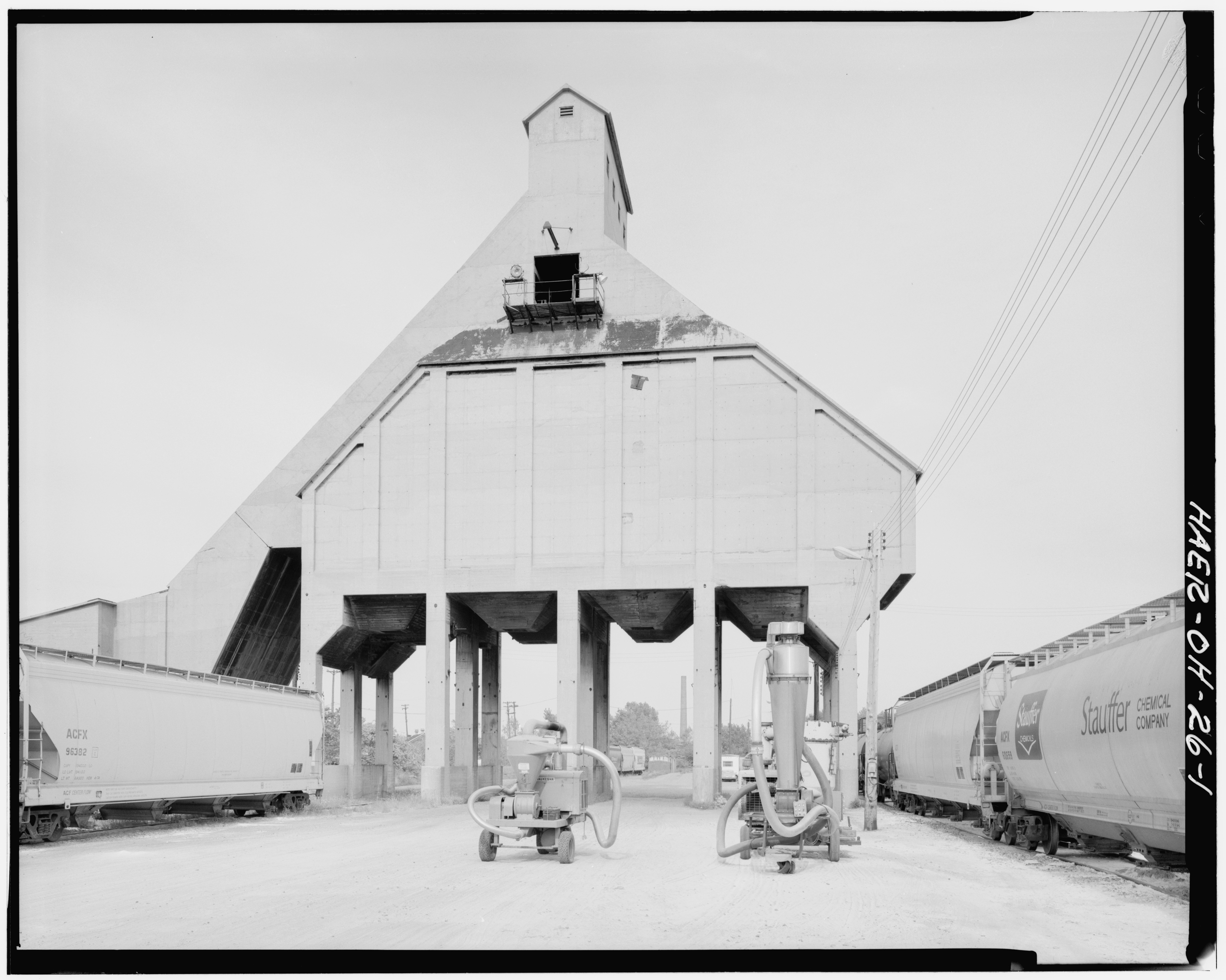
Collinwood Yard, Cleveland, Ohio, now demolished, c.1968

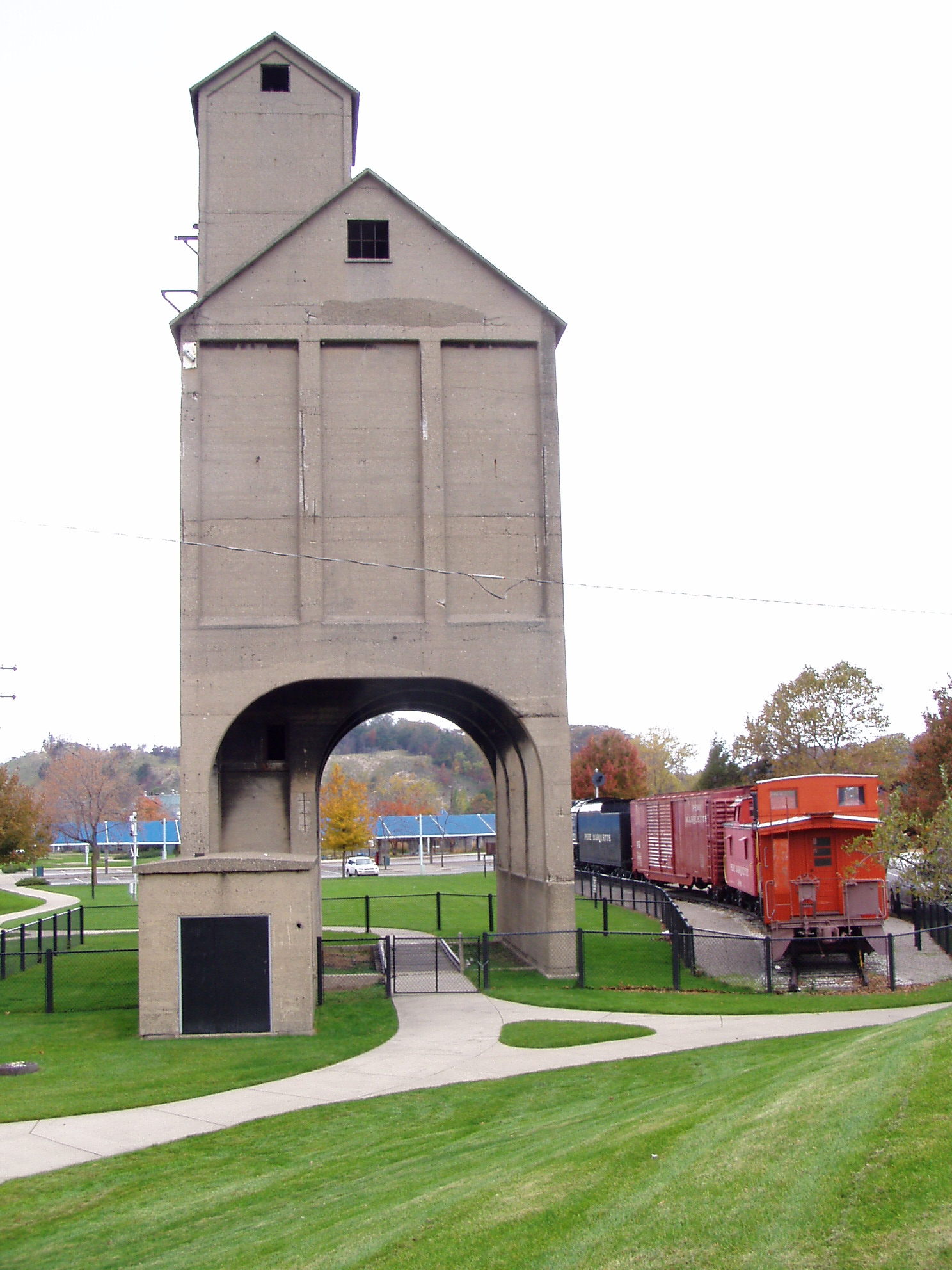
Grand Trunk Western Railroad Grand Haven Coal Tipple (coaling tower), Grand Haven, Michigan, 2006

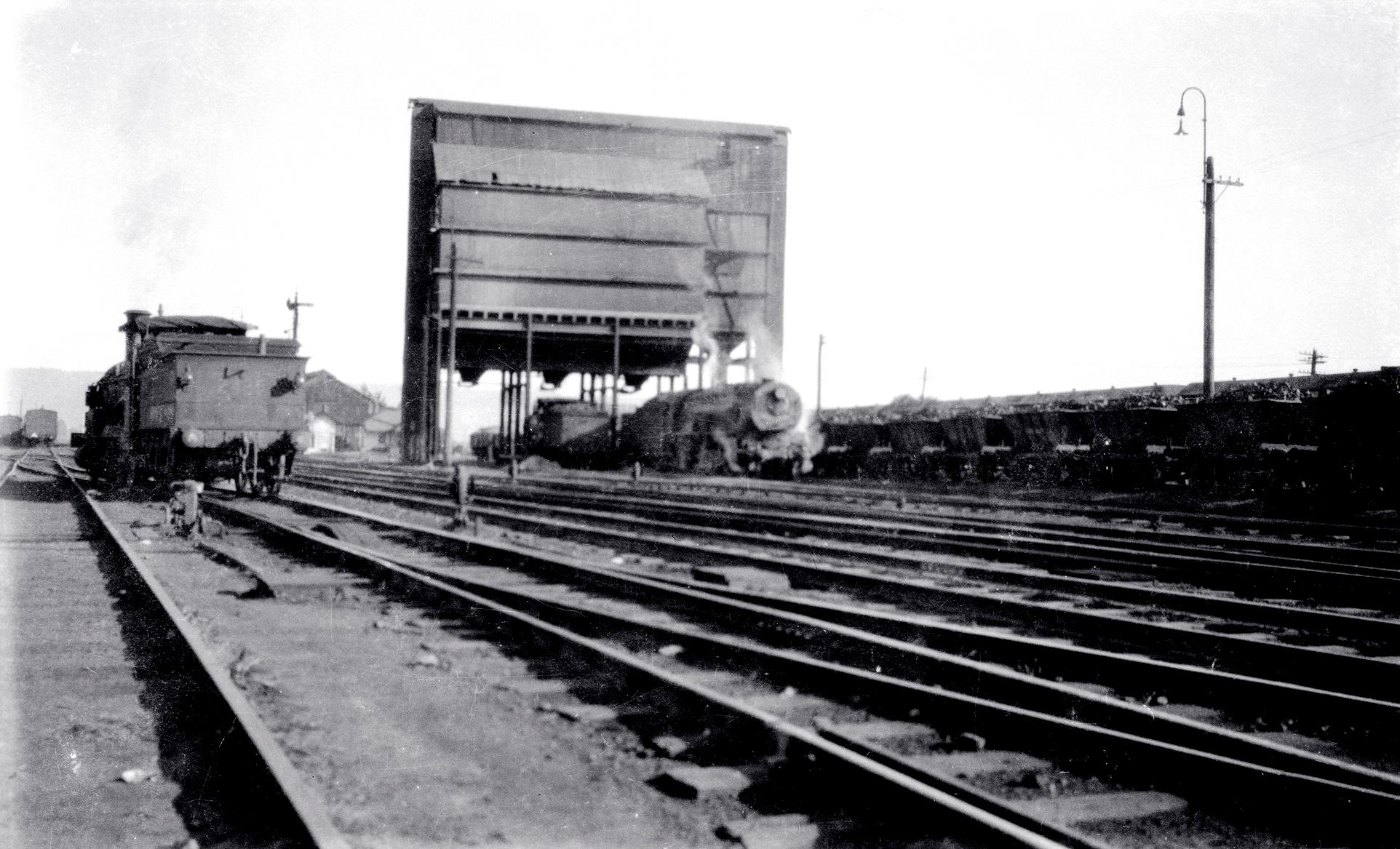
Penrith, New South Wales, Australia, now demolished, 1939

== See also ==
- Grand Trunk Western Railroad Grand Haven Coal Tipple: A coaling tower on the National Register of Historic Places
- Coalinga, California: A town founded as a coaling tower operation.
- Motive power depot
- Roundhouse
