= DR Class 01.5 =

1960s East German train locomotive class

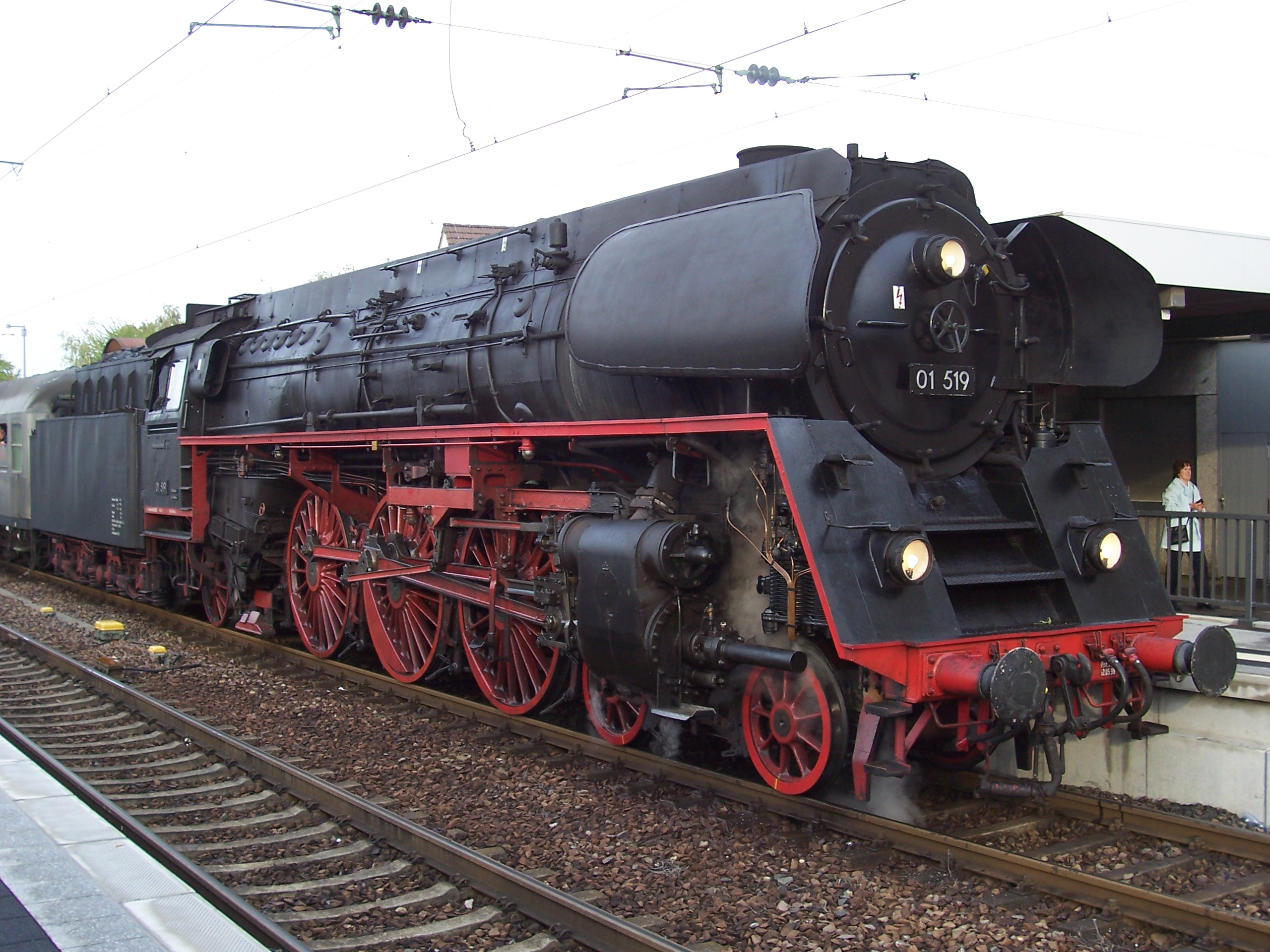
- 01 519 at Schifferstadt, October 2005
Type and origin
- Power type: Steam
- Rebuild date: 1962–1965
- Number rebuilt: 35
Specifications
- Configuration
  - Whyte: 4-6-2
  - UIC: 2′C1′ h2
  - German: S 36.20
- Gauge: 1,435 mm (4 ft 8 1/2 in)
- Leading dia.: 1,000 mm (3 ft 3 3/8 in)
- Driver dia.: 2,000 mm (6 ft 6 3/4 in)
- Trailing dia.: 1,250 mm (4 ft 1 1/4 in)
- Wheelbase
  - Axle spacing (Asymmetrical): 2,200 mm (7 ft 2 5/8 in) +; 1,800 mm (5 ft 10 7/8 in) +; 2,300 mm (7 ft 6 1/2 in) +; 2,300 mm (7 ft 6 1/2 in) +; 3,800 mm (12 ft 5 5/8 in)
  - Engine: 12,400 mm (40 ft 8 1/4 in)
  - incl. tender: 20,320 mm (66 ft 8 in)
- Length
  - Over headstocks: 23,050 mm (75 ft 7 1/2 in)
  - Over buffers: 24,350 mm (79 ft 10 5/8 in)
- Width: 3,100 mm (10 ft 2 1/16 in)
- Height: 4,500 mm (14 ft 9 3/16 in)
- Axle load: 20.1 tonnes (19.8 long tons; 22.2 short tons)
- Adhesive weight: 60.4 tonnes (59.4 long tons; 66.6 short tons)
- Empty weight: 98.9 tonnes (97.3 long tons; 109.0 short tons)
- Service weight: 110.0 tonnes (108.3 long tons; 121.3 short tons)
- Total weight: Coal-fired: 183.48 tonnes (180.58 long tons; 202.25 short tons); Oil-fired: 189.93 tonnes (186.93 long tons; 209.36 short tons)
- Fuel type: 2′2′ T 34
- Fuel capacity: Coal: 10 tonnes (9.8 long tons; 11 short tons) or; Fuel oil: 13.5 m^{3} (3,000 imp gal; 3,600 US gal)
- Water cap.: 34 m^{3} (7,500 imp gal; 9,000 US gal)
- Firebox
  - Grate area: 4.87 m^{2} (52.4 sq ft)
- Boiler
  - Pitch: 3,150 mm (10 ft 4 in)
  - Tube plates: 5,500 mm (18 ft 1/2 in)
  - Small tubes: 54 mm (2 1/8 in), 125 off
  - Large tubes: 140 mm (5 1/2 in), 43 off
- Boiler pressure: 16 bar (16.3 kgf/cm^{2}; 232 psi)
- Heating surface
  - Firebox: 23.5 m^{2} (253 sq ft)
  - Tubes: 103.7 m^{2} (1,116 sq ft)
  - Flues: 97.3 m^{2} (1,047 sq ft)
  - Total surface: 224.5 m^{2} (2,416 sq ft)
- Superheater
  - Heating area: 97.5 m^{2} (1,049 sq ft)
- Cylinders: Two, outside
- Cylinder size: 600 mm × 660 mm (23 5/8 in × 26 in)
- Valve gear: Walschaerts (Heusinger)
- Train heating: Steam
Performance figures
- Maximum speed: forwards: 130 km/h (81 mph); backwards: 50 km/h (31 mph)
- Indicated power: 1,839 kW (2,500 PS; 2,466 hp)
Career
- Numbers: Originally: 01 501 – 01 535 from 1970: Oil-fired: 01 0501 – 01 0535; Coal-fired: 01 1506 – 01 1519
- Retired: 1991

DR Class 01.5 was a class of Deutsche Reichsbahn (East German) express train locomotives that were 'reconstructed' from those of the pre-war DRG Class 01.

== History ==
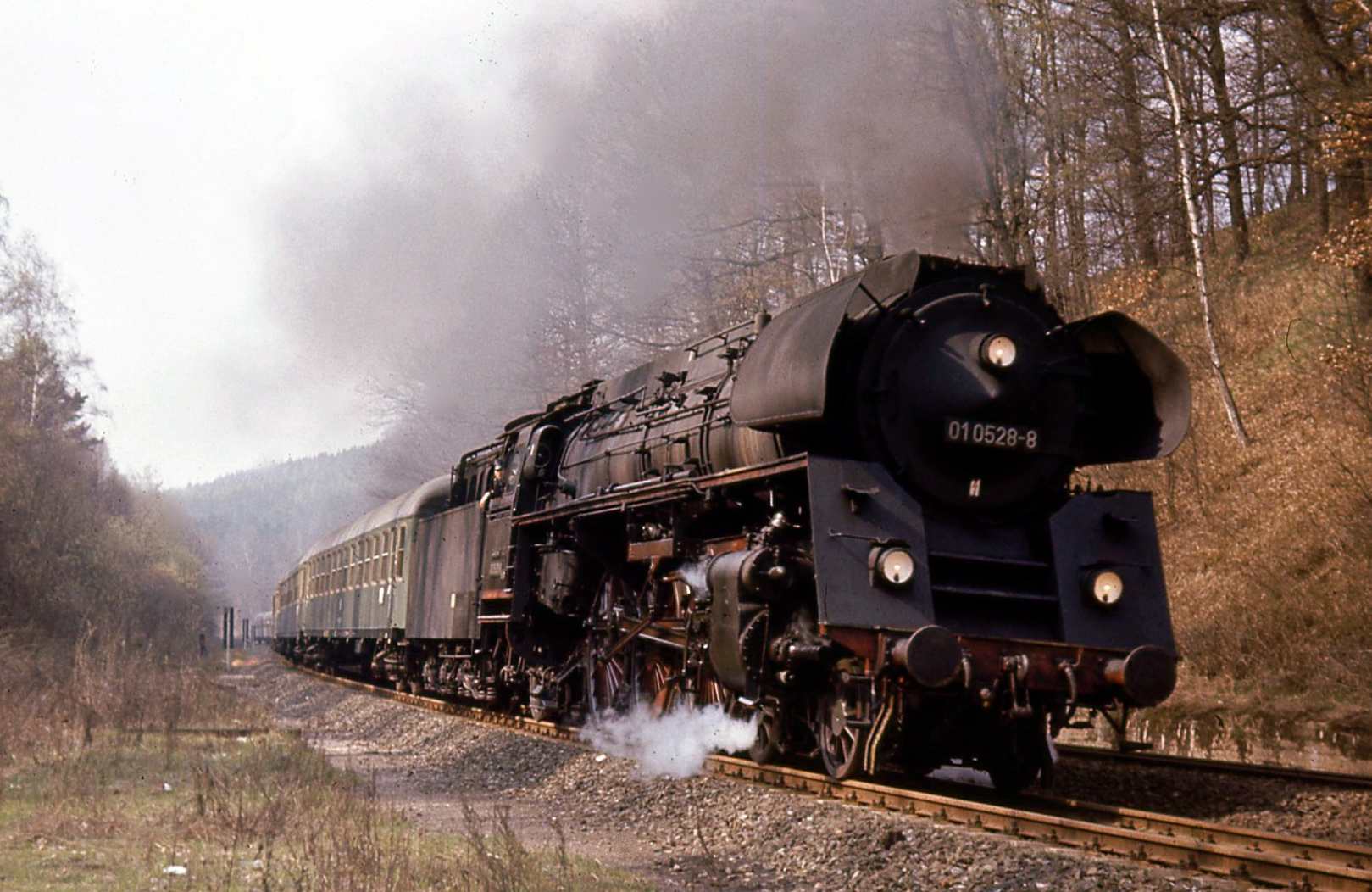
01 0528-8 approaches Hönebach Tunnel, heading towards the GDR, Easter 1972.

In 1962 the repair shop (Reichsbahnausbesserungswerk) of RAW Meiningen rebuilt 35 Class 01 engines. At that time the locomotives were still vital for heavy passenger train duties, but the locomotive frame and boiler were so worn that it was essential to replace them. Like the DB rebuilds in West Germany after the Second World War, only those locomotives with more powerful brakes (i.e. those from no. 01 102 onwards) and 1,000 mm (3 ft 3 3/8 in) carrying wheels were converted.

The rebuild did not just involve the installation of a new boiler; the entire locomotive underwent modification. The most obvious external change was the steam space cover running the length of the boiler barrel and copied from the ČSD Class 477.0, which lent the locomotives a sleek, modern appearance. The large smoke deflectors too were replaced by smaller ones with the upper front corners clipped off at an angle.

The new boiler made the so-called Reko-01 (Reko is short for Rekolokomotive) into the most powerful German express train steam locomotive. In addition to a combustion chamber and the well-known IfS mixer-preheater, the 01.5's boiler was fitted with three full bore boiler safety valves (Ackermann valves, nominal width 60). The engines were given Trofimoff valves and, apart from 01 501 and 01 520, new welded cylinders. The new boiler came with a new, welded driver's cab with upholstered seats, side-pull regulator and other improvements to the working conditions of the locomotive crew, as well as an Indusi system. The latter was required for the border-crossing traffic to Bebra and Hamburg-Altona and services on the Dresden–Berlin line. Because the coupled wheelsets on many engines had to be replaced due to fractured spokes, eight examples (502, 504, 508, 509, 511, 513, 517, 518) were fitted with Boxpok wheels made of cast iron, like those already used in the Soviet Union and the United States. These did not prove themselves, however, due to manufacturing defects and were later swapped out for spoked wheels from retired 01s. In order to hide the ugly wheelsets, the Boxpok locomotives and several other vehicles were fitted with full skirts.

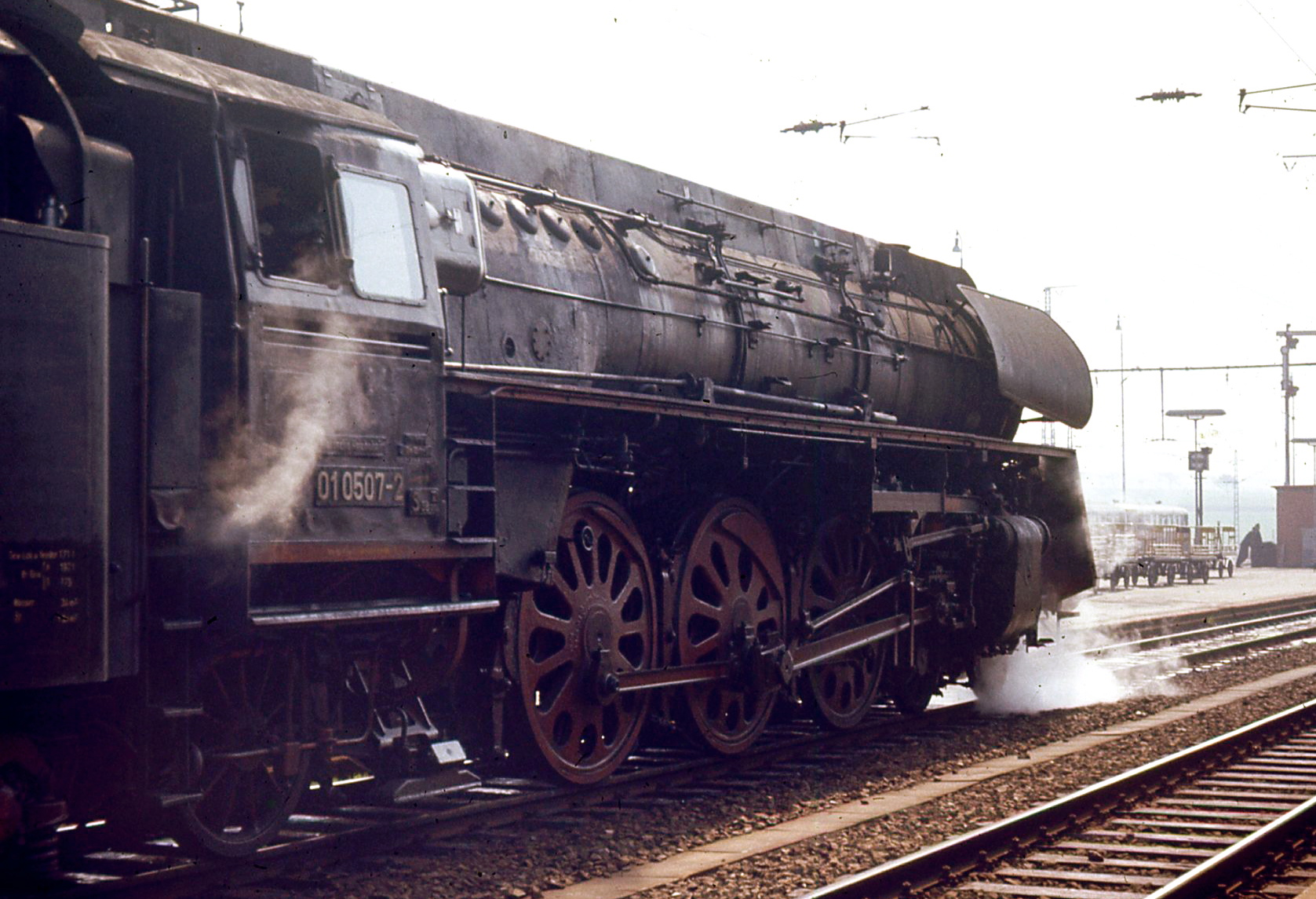
01 0507-1 with Boxpok wheels, 1972

From locomotive number 01 519, all the locomotives were given oil-firing systems when rebuilt, which enabled a further increase in performance. Apart from the seven engines at Berlin Ostbahnhof locomotive depot, all the other engines were later converted to primary oil-firing. The tenders could carry 13.5 tonnes of heavy fuel oil. During the course of the oil crisis in the early 1980s all the oil-fired locomotives were withdrawn. All of the locomotives were originally meant to remain in service for two maintenance periods (each of 6 years), however every locomotive exceeded this. After they were withdrawn from active duty, several engines were used as heating locomotives. Number 01 519 was refurbished in 1990-91 from being a heating engine, and was made fully operational by the DR. It was not taken out of service until 1991.

== Accident ==
Number 01 516, at the time already sporting its computer number 01 1516-2, achieved regrettable notoriety, when on 27 November 1977 its boiler exploded at Bitterfeld station due to a lack of water, killing not only the crew of two, but another seven bystanders, and injuring more than 50 people. This was the last boiler explosion in Germany. Such a mishap had been seen at the time as inconceivable because the technical condition of the boilers was checked thoroughly and it was believed that appropriately trained crews – not least for their own interests – would follow the proper safety procedures.

On a similar journey with experienced staff in spring 1978 an attempt was made to investigate the circumstances of the accident. The DR's investigation report, which was not made public, showed that the regular engine driver was being retrained as an electric locomotive driver and had been replaced by an engine driver who was more actively involved in everything. Because the stoker formed a close-knit team with his regular driver and was not used to this situation, a lack of communication led to a shortage of water on the approach to Bitterfeld station.

The accident had no knock-on effect on the employment of steam locomotives in the GDR.

== Preserved locomotives ==
Five DR Class 01.5 steam locomotives have been preserved:

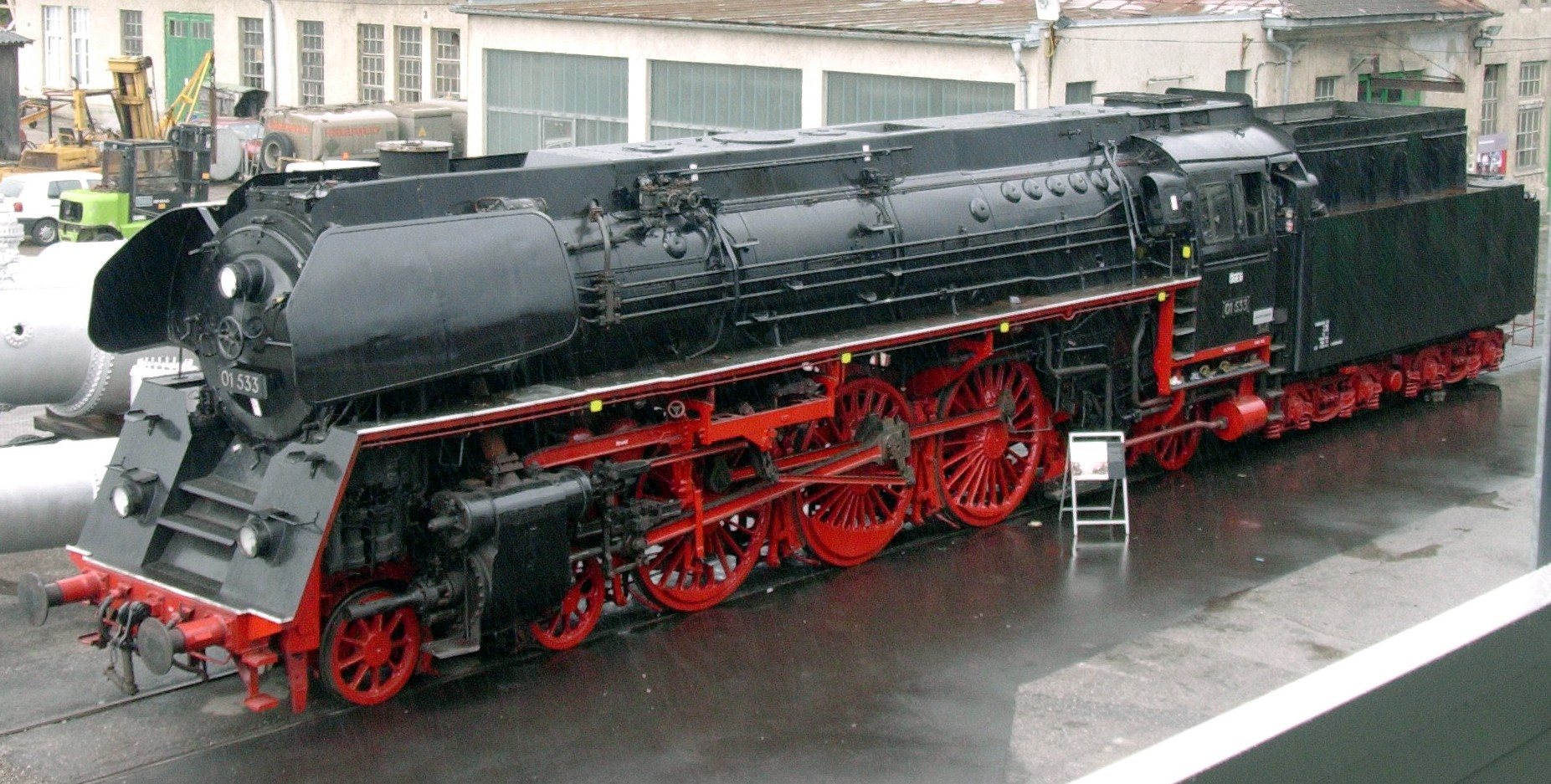
ÖGEG 01.533

- 01 509 – Preßnitztalbahn, oil-fired, operational
- 01 514 – Technik Museum Speyer
- 01 519 – Zollernbahn Railway Friends
- 01 531 – DB Museum; museum loco at Arnstadt locomotive depot.
- 01 533 – ÖGEG / Austria

== Fleet list ==
Table of locomotives
Number	Rebuilt from	Rebuild year	Works No.
01 501	01 174	1962	103
01 502	01 157	1962	104
01 503	01 142	1962	105
01 504	01 224	1962	106
01 505	01 121	1962	107
01 506	01 127	1962	108
01 507	01 136	1962	109
01 508	01 153	1963	110
01 509	01 143	1963	111
01 510	01 139	1963	112
01 511	01 218	1963	113
01 512	01 175	1963	114
01 513	01 152	1963	115
01 514	01 208	1963	116
01 515	01 160	1963	117
01 516	01 117	1963	118
01 517	01 107	1963	119
01 518	01 185	1963	120
01 519	01 186	1964	122
01 520	01 162	1964	123
01 521	01 144	1964	124
01 522	01 184	1964	125
01 523	01 191	1964	126
01 524	01 129	1964	127
01 525	01 219	1964	128
01 526	01 163	1964	129
01 527	01 225	1964	130
01 528	01 119	1964	131
01 529	01 205	1964	132
01 530	01 221	1964	133
01 531	01 158	1964	134
01 532	01 135	1964	135
01 533	01 116	1964	137
01 534	01 203	1965	138
01 535	01 156	1965	139

== See also ==
- List of East German Deutsche Reichsbahn locomotives and railbuses
- Rekolok

== Literature ==
- Weisbrod, Manfred; Petznick, Wolfgang (1979). Baureihe 01 (in German). Berlin: transpress Verlag.
- Großes Lok-Portrait 01.5 – EK-Themen 19 (in German). Freiburg: EK-Verlag. 1995.
- Hütter, Ingo (2009). Die Dampflokomotiven der Baureihen 01 bis 45 der DRG, DRB, DB, und DR (in German). Werl: DGEG Medien. pp. 66–68. ISBN 978-3-937189-45-1.
- Lucas, Volker; Schnabel, Heinz (2002). Die Baureihe 01.5. Die legendäre Reko-01 der Deutschen Reichsbahn (in German). Freiburg: EK-Verlag. ISBN 3-88255-113-5.
- Endisch, Dirk (2001). Baureihe 01.5 (in German) (1st ed.). Stuttgart: transpress. ISBN 3-613-71167-2.
- Weisbrod, Manfred; Rittig, Franz (2002). Reko-Lokomotiven – Eisenbahn-Journal Spezial (in German). Fürstenfeldbruck: Verlagsgruppe Bahn. ISBN 3-89610-092-0.
- Weisbrod, Manfred; Müller, Hans; Petznik, Wolfgang (1976). Dampflokomotiven deutscher Eisenbahnen, Baureihe 01–39 (EFA 1.1) (in German) (3rd ed.). Düsseldorf: Alba Buchverlag. pp. 26–29, 241. ISBN 3-87094-081-6.
