= Chemnitz Hauptbahnhof =

Railway station in Germany

Chemnitz Hbf
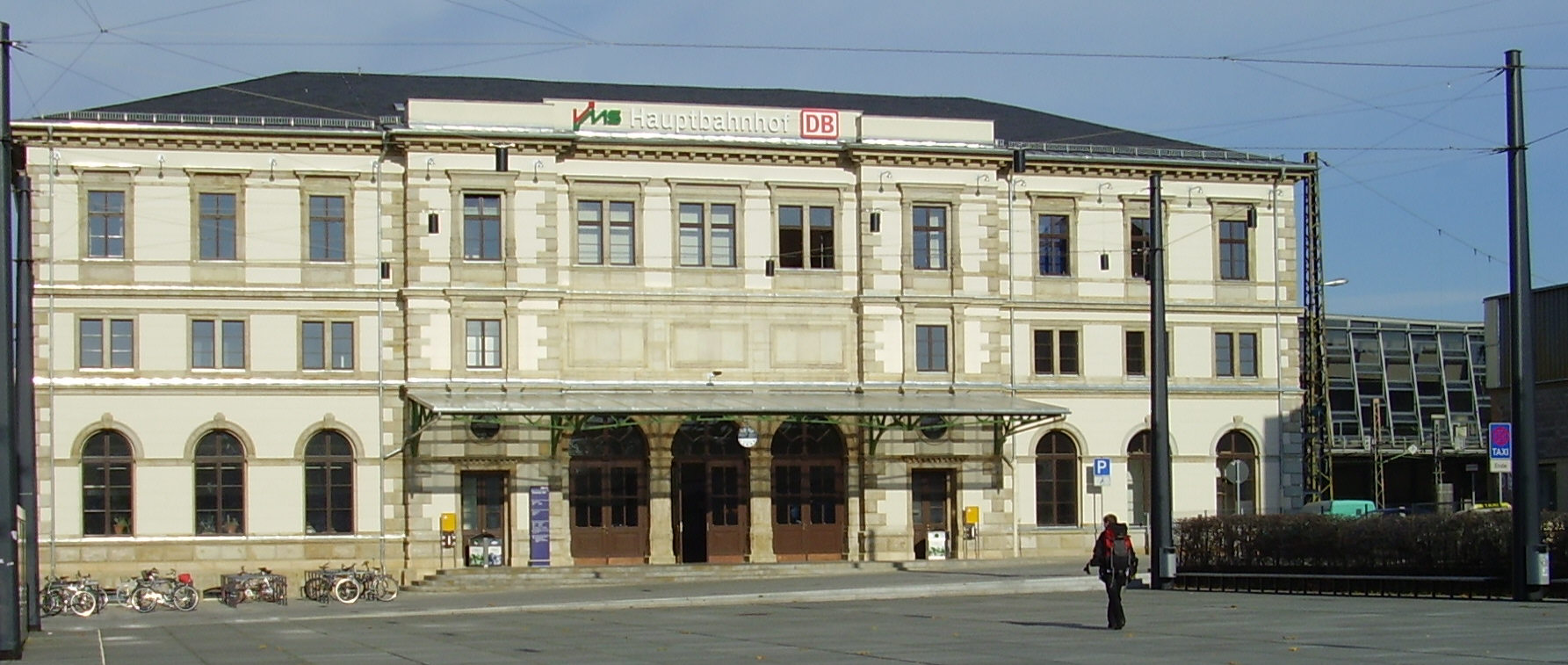
- Station façade

General information
- Other names: Karl-Marx-Stadt Hbf (1953–90)
- Location: Bahnhofstr. 1, Chemnitz, Saxony; Germany
- Coordinates: 50°50′25″N 12°55′50″E
- Lines: Dresden–Werdau; Riesa–Chemnitz; Chemnitz–Aue; Neukieritzsch–Chemnitz
- Platforms: 14

Construction
- Accessible: Yes

Other information
- Station code: 1040
- DS100 code: DC
- IBNR: 8010184
- Category: 2
- Fare zone: VMS: 13
- Website: www.bahnhof.de

History
- Opened: 1852; 174 years ago
Services
| Preceding station | DB Fernverkehr | Following station |
|---|---|---|
| Terminus | IC 17 | Freiberg (Sachs) towards Rostock Hbf |
| Preceding station | Erzgebirgsbahn | Following station |
| Terminus | RB 80 | Niederwiesa towards Cranzahl |
| Terminus | RB 81 | Niederwiesa towards Grünthal |
| Preceding station | Mitteldeutsche Regiobahn | Following station |
| Hohenstein-Ernstthal towards Hof Hbf | RE 3 | Flöha towards Dresden Hbf |
| Terminus | RE 6 | Burgstädt towards Leipzig Hbf |
| Chemnitz Süd towards Zwickau Hbf | RB 30 | Chemnitz-Hilbersdorf towards Dresden Hbf |
| Mittweida towards Chemnitz Hbf | RB 45 | Terminus |
| Preceding station | City-Bahn Chemnitz | Following station |
| Chemnitz Hbf / Bahnhofstraße towards Chemnitz Hbf | C11 | Chemnitz Omnibusbahnhof towards Stollberg (Sachs) |
| Chemnitz Hbf / Bahnhofstraße towards Aue (Sachs) | C13 | Küchwald towards Burgstädt |
| Chemnitz Hbf / Bahnhofstraße towards Thalheim (Erzgeb) | C14 | Chemnitz-Kinderwaldstätte towards Mittweida |
| Chemnitz Hbf / Bahnhofstraße towards Chemnitz Technopark | C15 | Chemnitz-Hilbersdorf towards Hainichen |
Location

Chemnitz Hauptbahnhof is the main railway station in Chemnitz in Saxony, Germany.

== Station building ==
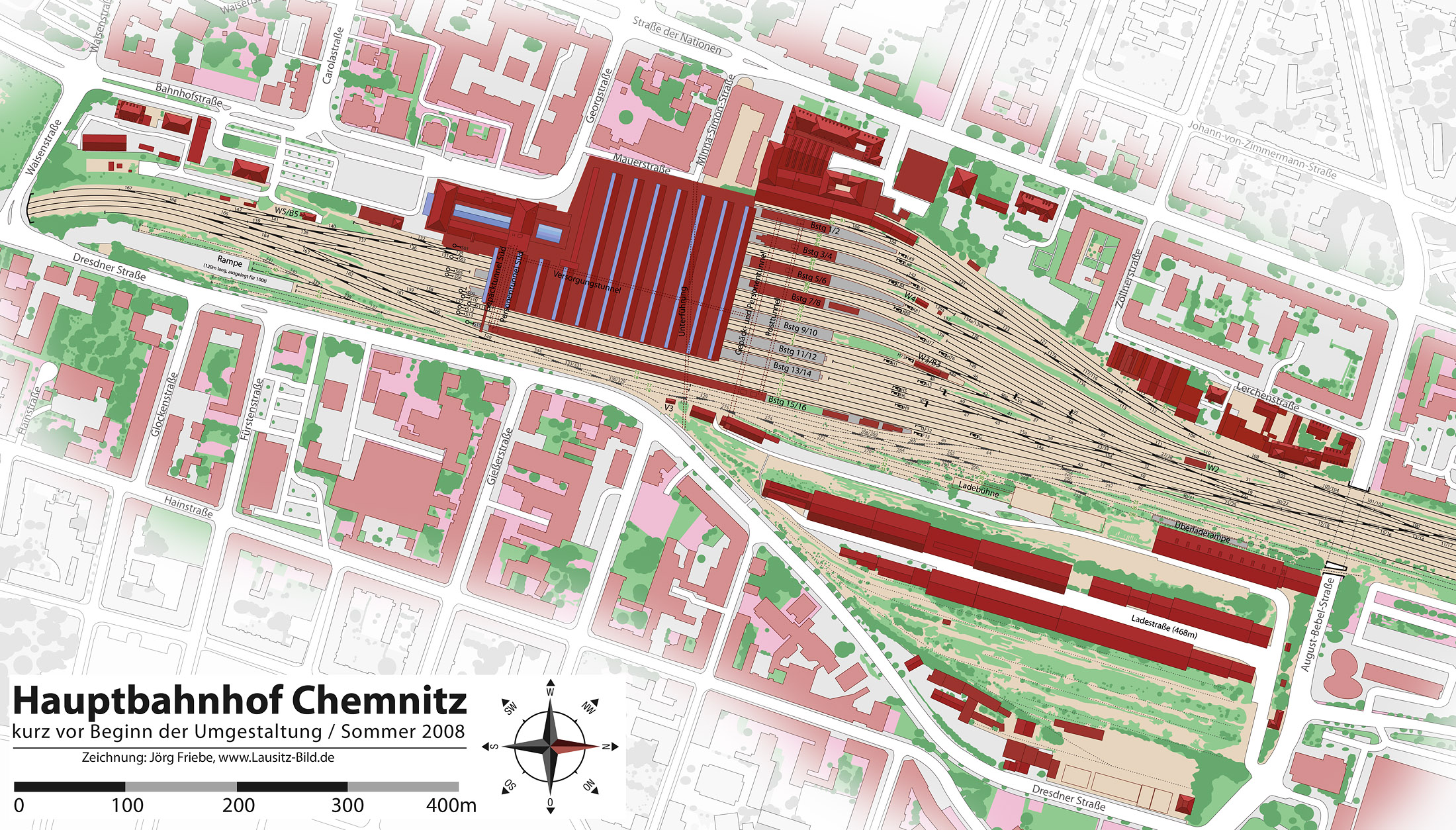
Chemnitz Hauptbahnhof in 2008

The station has a combination of terminating and through platforms. Platform tracks 5 to 9 terminate and tracks 1 to 4 and 10 to 14 continue to the west of Chemnitz towards Zwickau, Nuremberg and Göttingen. Tracks 11 to 14 are reached by a passenger subway. The subway also passes under tracks 15 and 16, which have no platforms. The platforms are also accessible by lift. From 15 December 2002 until 17 February 2013, "Chemnitz model" tram-trains of the City-Bahn Chemnitz operated from platform 102 (a tram track) in the station forecourt. The tram-train services now use platforms 1 to 4.

Bus lines 21 (Ebersdorf–Chemnitz Center (–Limbach-Oberfrohna) [from stop at Dresdner Str.], 22 (Glösa–Zentralhaltestelle), 23 (Heinersdorf–Neefepark), 31 (Flemmingstraße–Yorkgebiet) [from stop at Dresdner Str.] and 32 (Dresdner Str.–Rabenstein, Tierpark), tram lines 3 (Hauptbahnhof–Technopark) and 4 (Hauptbahnhof–Hutholz) and the City-Bahn lines to Aue, Stollberg and Thalheim connect the Hauptbahnhof to the central tram station in central Chemnitz. Near the Hauptbahnhof is the bus station. From here buses connect the city to its outskirts. Some of these lines also stop at the Hauptbahnhof

== History ==
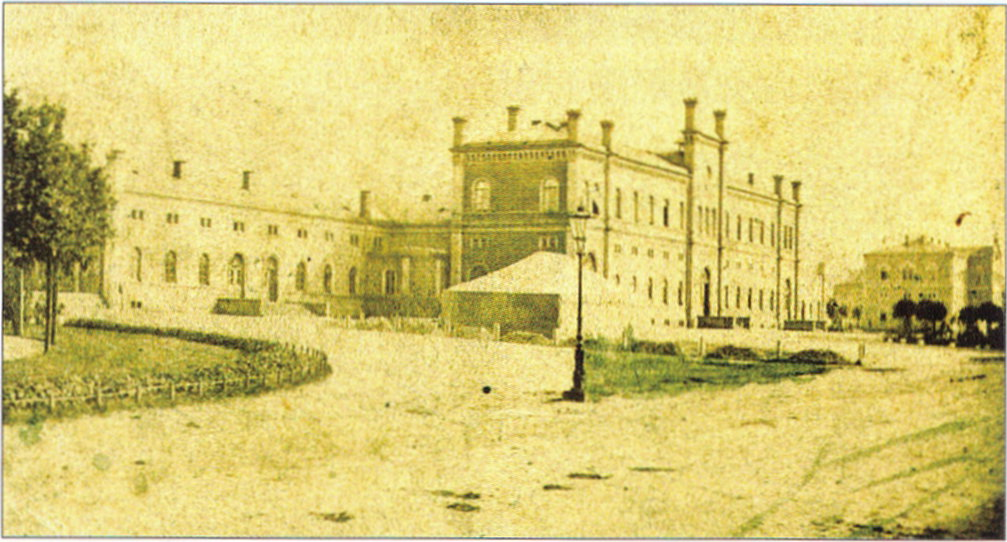
The original Chemnitz station in 1854

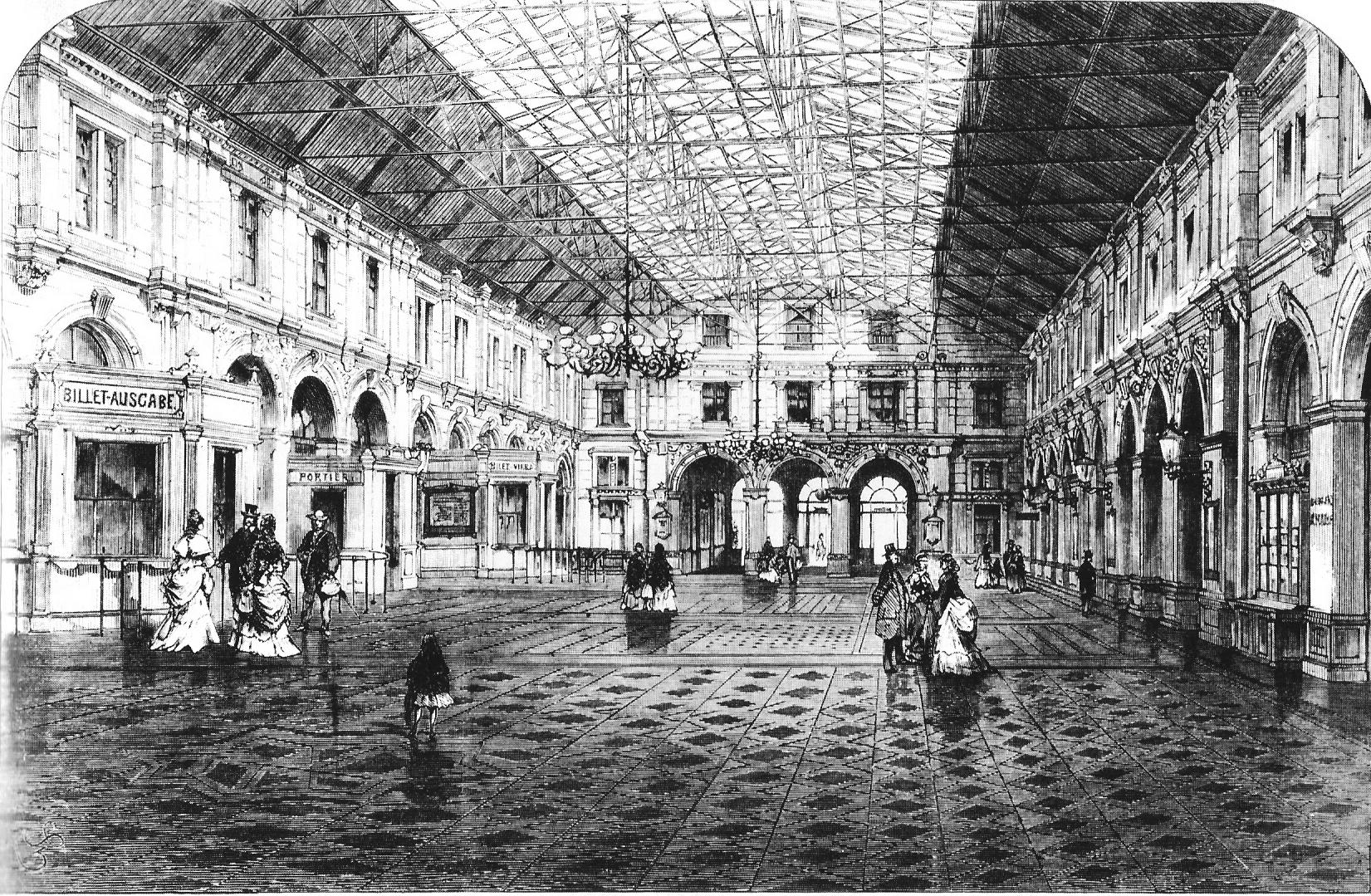
Entrance foyer in 1873

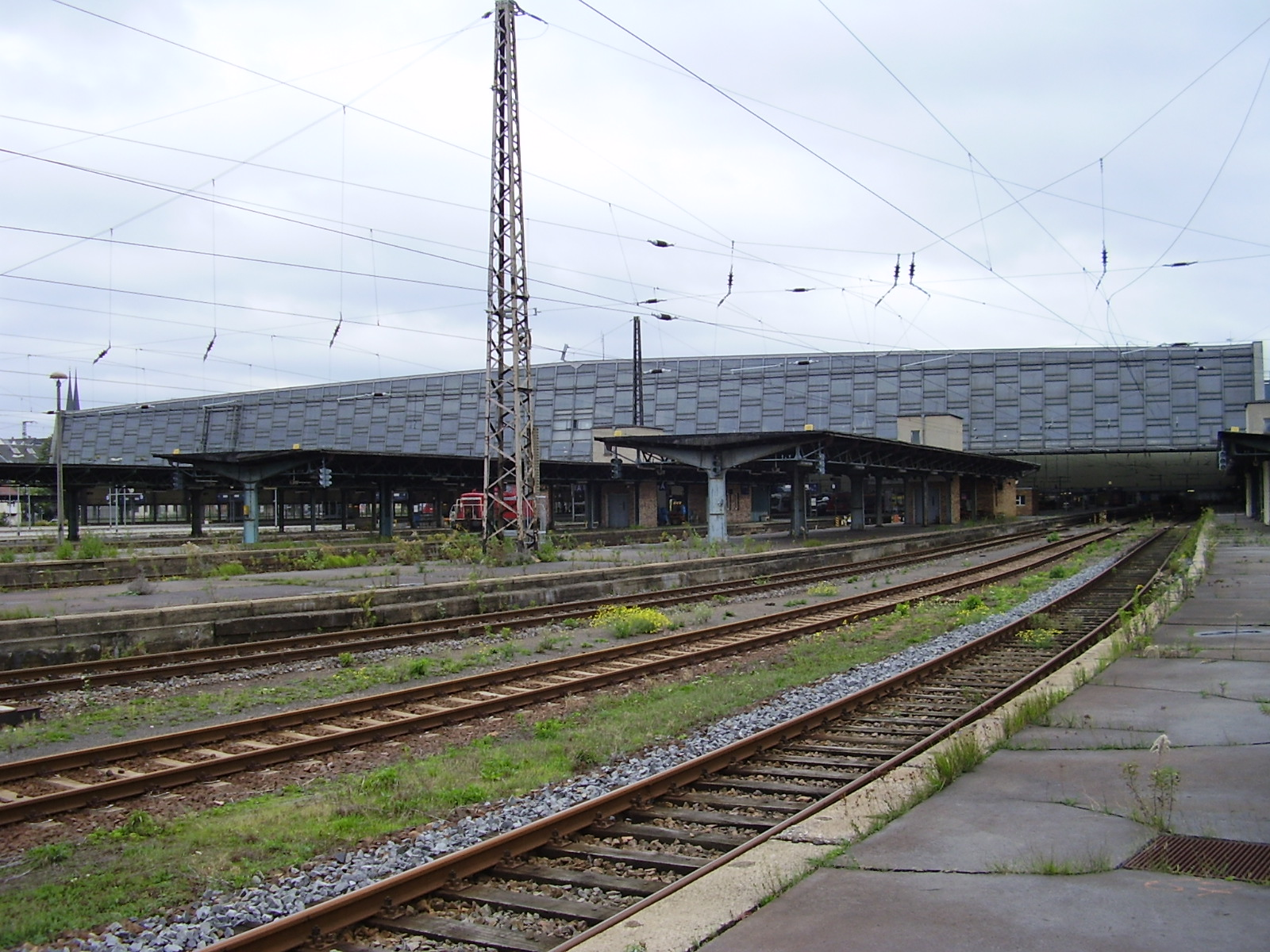
Platforms in 2006

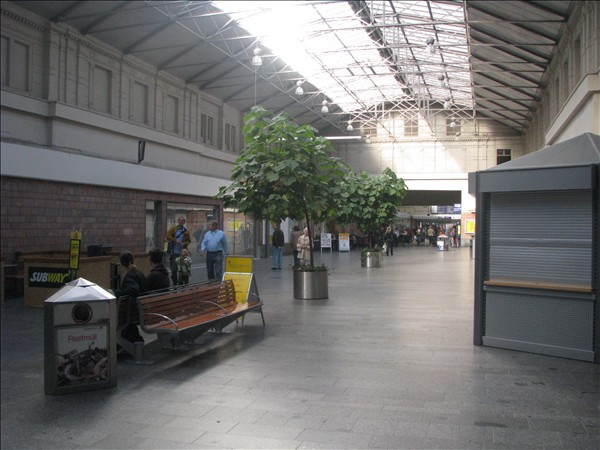
Entrance foyer in 2008

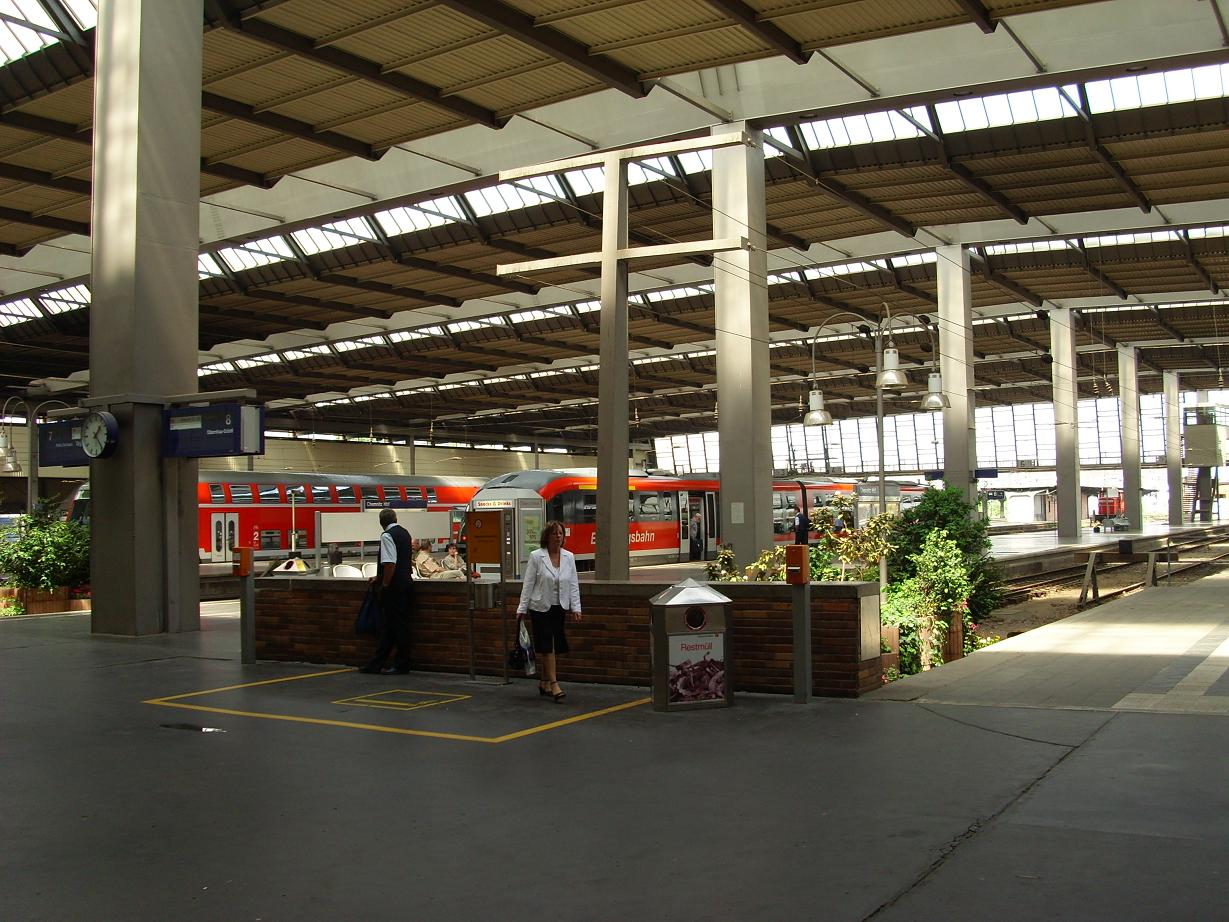
Platforms in 2008

In 1836, the Erzgebirge Railway Company (Erzgebirgische Eisenbahngesellschaft) was founded in Chemnitz to build a railway line from Riesa to Zwickau, but the line was not completed to Chemnitz until 1852. The Riesa–Chemnitz line was opened on 1 September 1852 by King Friedrich August II. This linked Chemnitz to the first German long distance railway between Leipzig and Dresden.

=== An ever growing rail network allows the station to grow ===
On 15 November 1858 with the opening of the extension of the line to Zwickau, the Nikolaibahnhof ("Nikolai station", now Chemnitz-Mitte station) was opened as the second station in Chemnitz and the original station was renamed Centralbahnhof (Central Station). The extension of the line made it necessary to extend the station's facilities.

Between 1858 and 1866 the first freight facilities were developed. After further lines were opened (in 1866 to Annaberg, in 1869 to Dresden and to Hainichen and in 1872 to Leipzig and to Limbach), the station had to be extended again. In 1869 construction of increased capacity for passenger services began. The main hall of the station was completed by the architect Engelhardt in 1872. More lines opened, to Aue in 1875, to Marienberg and Reitzenhain in 1875, to Stollberg in 1895 and to Wechselburg and Rochlitz in 1902.

In 1880 the coal and freight yard was opened at Kappel and in 1908 another station in the city was added as Chemnitz Süd. In 1910 construction began on a concourse, although the station building remained unchanged outwardly from the 1872 station. Chemnitz station had about 80,000 passengers a day in 1930, almost as many as Leipzig Hauptbahnhof.

=== After the Second World War ===
During the bombardment of the city on 5 March 1945 the station hall was severely damaged and was later demolished. In addition, waiting rooms and offices were burned after a plane was shot down and fell on the building. From 1974 VEB Stahlbau Dessau began construction of the existing platform hall, which was completed in 1975. The Dresden–Chemnitz–Zwickau main line ran on the western side of the station's through tracks, as it had before the Second World War. In the winter 1974/1975 timetable nearly 300 daily passenger trains arrived or departed at the station.

Between 1976 and 1993, the station (then called Karl-Marx-Stadt Hauptbahnhof) was part of the Stadt- und Vorortbahnverkehr ("urban and suburban rail transport system"), an S-Bahn-like system for the urban agglomeration, running on the line between Flöha and Hohenstein-Ernstthal.

=== Development to a regional railway station ===
Chemnitz has had at times national connections, in addition to its significance as a regional transport hub. A Städteexpress ("city express") ran to Berlin during the Communist period. After the fall, Interregio services ran via Berlin to Rostock (some ran to Magdeburg, Stralsund, Binz or Barth), to Oberstdorf (via Nuremberg and Munich), to Karlsruhe (via Stuttgart) and to Aachen (via Düsseldorf). An Intercity-Express service ran to Cologne using ICE TD diesel tilting trains. Most recently Intercity (IC) services ran on the Dresden–Chemnitz–Nuremberg route. Sections of off-peak IC trains ran to and from Cologne and Hamburg, continuing to Flensburg.

Since 2006, Chemnitz has not been served by Deutsche Bahn long-distance trains, only by regional trains. The metropolitan area of Chemnitz-Zwickau (1.2 million inhabitants) was 16 years the largest region in Germany without any Deutsche Bahn long-distance train services.

Vogtlandbahn has operated the Vogtland-Express since 2005 (except between 15 February 2009 and 8 April 2009) between Plauen and Berlin. 2022 started the Intercity-Line 17 from Berlin to Chemnitz (Intercity (IC)).

=== Recent developments ===
With the formation of the Middle Saxony Transport Association (Verkehrsverbund Mittelsachsen) with Chemnitz as its central hub, Chemnitz Hauptbahnhof has taken on new functions. Work at the station from 2003 to 2005 improved the interface between trams, buses and the station. Further construction was carried out to adapt the station for tram-trains.

== Train services ==
The following services currently call at the station:

| Line | Route | Frequency (min) | Operator |
|---|---|---|---|
| IC 17 | Chemnitz – Dresden – BER Airport – Berlin Hbf – Neustrelitz – Rostock | Twice a day | DB Fernverkehr |
| RE 3 | Dresden Hbf – Freiberg (Sachs) – Chemnitz – Hohenstein-Ernstthal – Glauchau (Sachs) – Zwickau (Sachs) Hbf – Hof Hbf | 60 | BOB |
| RE 6 | Chemnitz – Burgstädt – Narsdorf – Geithain – Bad Lausick – Leipzig Hbf | 60 | Transdev Regio Ost |
| RB 30 | Dresden Hbf – Freiberg (Sachs) – Chemnitz – Wüstenbrand – Hohenstein-Ernstthal – Glauchau (Sachs) –Zwickau (Sachs) Hbf | 60 | BOB |
| RB 45 | Chemnitz – Mittweida – Waldheim – Döbeln Hbf – Riesa (– Elsterwerda) | 60 | BOB |
| RB 80 | Chemnitz – Flöha – Erdmannsdorf-Augustusburg – Zschopau – Wolkenstein – Annaberg-Buchholz unt Bf (– Cranzahl) | 60 | Erzgebirgsbahn |
| RB 81 | Chemnitz – Flöha – Falkenau – Pockau-Lengefeld – Olbernhau | 60 | Erzgebirgsbahn |
| C 11 | Chemnitz – Chemnitz Zentralhaltestelle – Neukirchen-Klaffenbach – Stollberg | 30 | City-Bahn Chemnitz |
| C 13 | Aue (Sachs) – Thalheim (Erzgeb) – Chemnitz Technopark – Chemnitz Zentralhaltestelle – Chemnitz – Burgstädt | 60 | City-Bahn Chemnitz |
| C 14 | Thalheim (Erzgeb) – Chemnitz Technopark – Chemnitz Zentralhaltestelle – Chemnitz – Oberlichtenau – Mittweida | 60 | City-Bahn Chemnitz |
| C 15 | Chemnitz Technopark – Chemnitz Zentralhaltestelle – Chemnitz – Niederwiesa – Frankenberg – Hainichen | 60 | City-Bahn Chemnitz |
As of June 2022

== See also ==
- List of railway stations in Saxony
- Rail transport in Germany
