= Flöha station =

Railway station in Flöha, Germany

Flöha
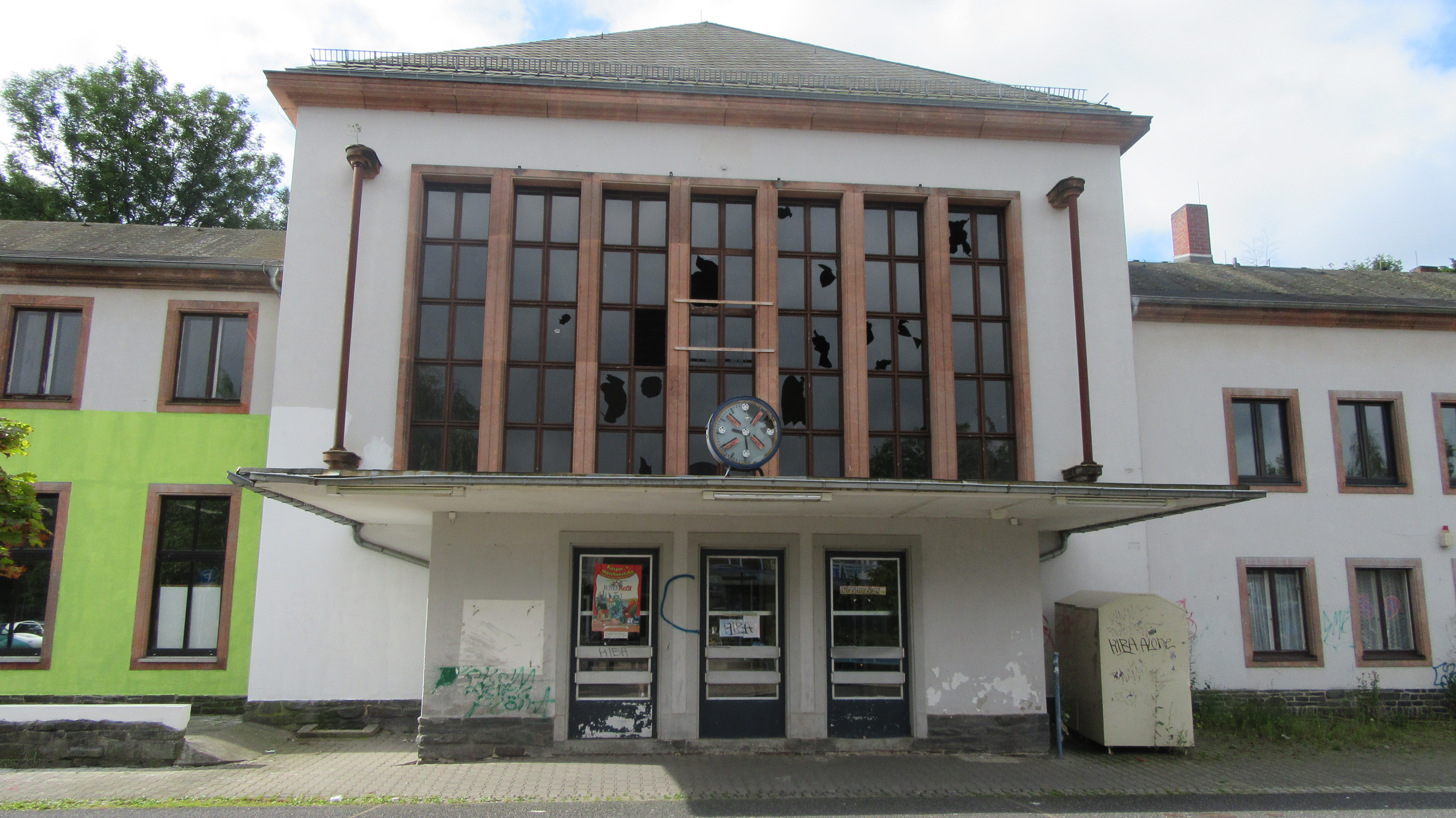
- Entrance building, street side

General information
- Location: Bahnhofstr. 2a, Flöha, Saxony; Germany
- Coordinates: 50°51′16″N 13°04′30″E
- Lines: Dresden–Werdau (km 67.365); Annaberg-Buchholz–Flöha (km 43.515); Reitzenhain–Flöha (km 57.920)
- Platforms: 6

Construction
- Accessible: Yes

Other information
- Station code: 1816
- DS100 code: DFL
- IBNR: 8010108
- Category: 4
- Website: www.bahnhof.de

History
- Opened: 1 February 1866
Location

Flöha station is an important station on the Dresden–Werdau railway in the town of Flöha in the German state of Saxony. From here, the railway lines to Pockau-Lengefeld and to Annaberg-Buchholz branch off.

== History ==
At first, Flöha station was only a through station on the Chemnitz–Annaberg railway, opened in 1866. With the building of the Freiberg–Flöha section of the Dresden–Werdau railway, a new station was built to the north-east of the existing station. Since then the entrance building has been a Keilbahnhof ("wedge station"). With the construction of the Reitzenhain–Flöha railway, opened in 1875, another station was built to the northeast by the Chemnitz-Komotauer Eisenbahngesellschaft (Chemnitz-Chomutov Railway Company). It also built a roundhouse where locomotives were heated (Heizhaus). Together with the Heizhaus of the state railway, a locomotive workshop developed, which from 1946 to 1950 was an independent Bahnbetriebswerk (locomotive depot). In addition to operations on the lines connecting to Flöha, the locomotives stationed here were also responsible for pushing trains on the ramp towards Freiberg.

The present stately entrance building was built during a large reconstruction of the station in the 1930s.

Although the station has been substantially reconstructed, there are still six platform faces available.

== Infrastructure ==
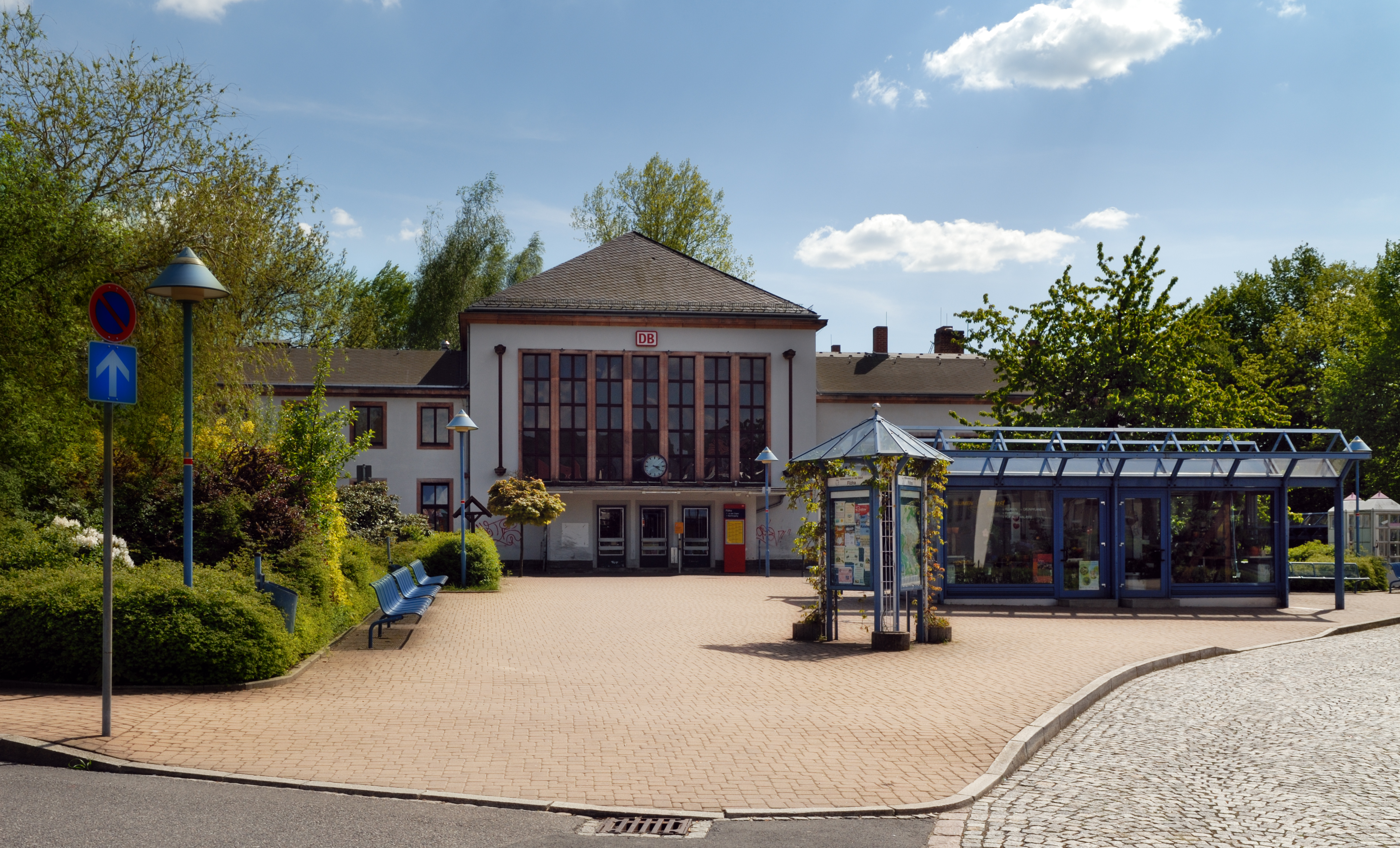
Flöha station building and station forecourt (May 2008)

The station now has three covered platforms with two platform tracks each and a siding. The platforms can be reached by a passenger subway running all the way under the station from the entrance building to the town.

The station has been remotely-controlled by an electronic interlocking system since 18 July 2004, but signalbox W1 is still standing near the exit to Annaberg and a carriage shed; signalbox B2 was demolished in December 2007.

== Buildings ==
- Entrance building (opened on 19 September 1934)
- Service building (built in 1893)
- Signalbox W1 (commissioned 1934; decommissioned 18 July 2004)
- Signalbox B2 (commissioned 1934; decommissioned 18 July 2004; demolished December 2007)
- Carriage shed (built in 1883)

== Transport services ==
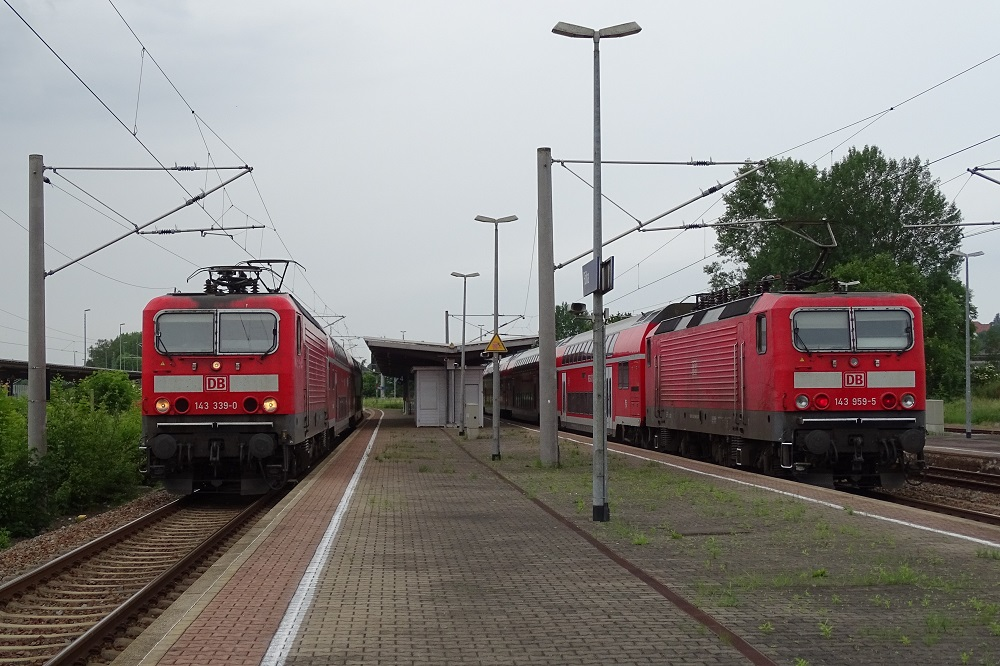
Crossing of the RB 30 to Dresden (left) and RE 3 to Hof (right) in Flöha station on 11 June 2016 (last day of DB Regio operations on both services)

In the summer 2016, the following services operated at Flöha station:

Line	Route	Frequency (min)	Operator
RE 3	Dresden – Freiberg (Sachs) – Flöha – Chemnitz – Glauchau (Sachs) – Zwickau (Sachs) – Plauen (Vogtl) – Hof	60	Mitteldeutsche Regiobahn
RB 30	Dresden – Freiberg (Sachs) – Flöha – Chemnitz – Glauchau (Sachs) – Zwickau (Sachs)	60	Mitteldeutsche Regiobahn
RB 80	Chemnitz – Flöha – Zschopau – Annaberg-Buchholz – Cranzahl	60	Erzgebirgsbahn
RB 81	Chemnitz – Flöha – Pockau-Lengefeld – Olbernhau-Grünthal	60	Erzgebirgsbahn
