= Výsluní =

- Town
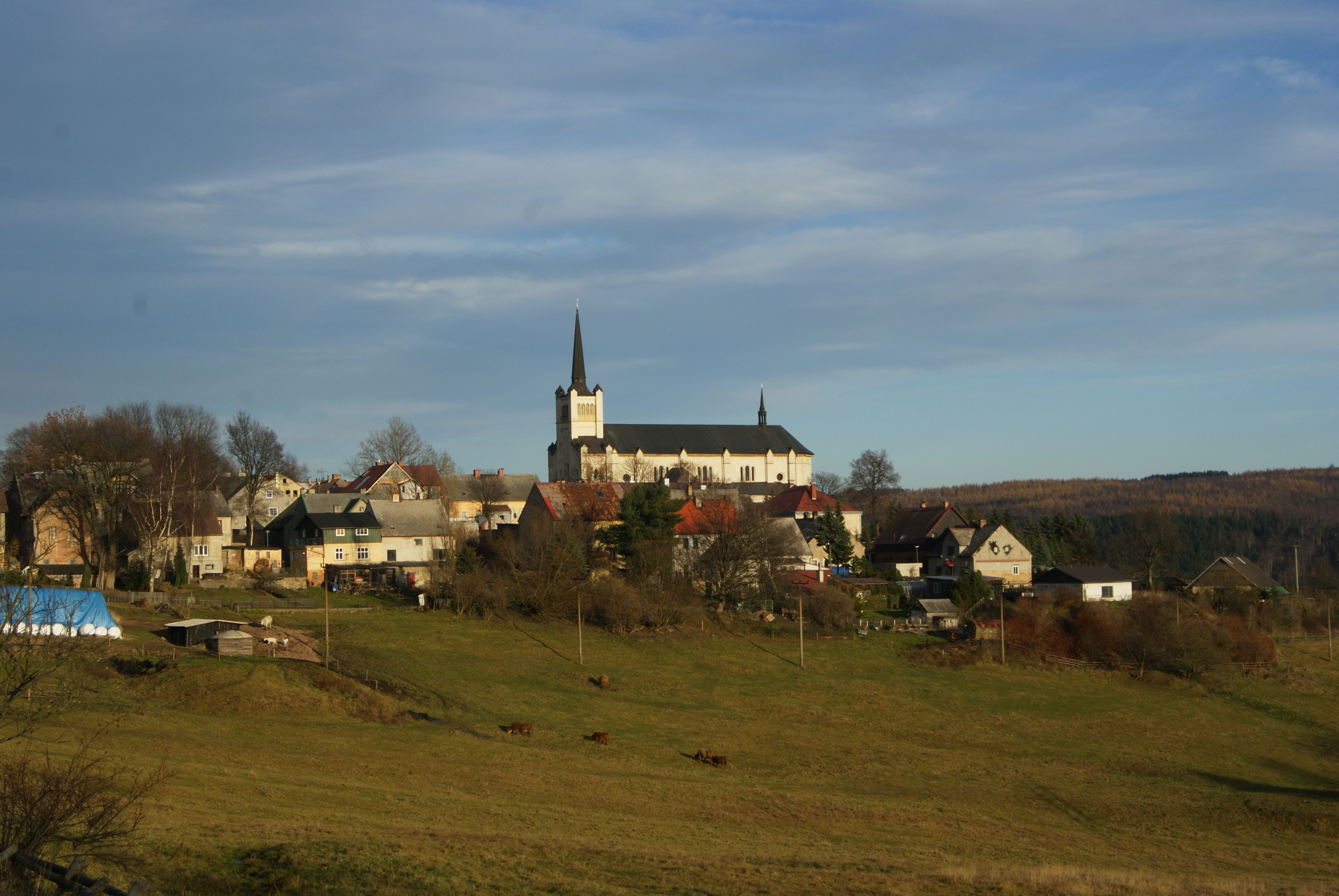
- General view of the town

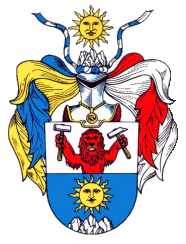
- Coat of arms

- Location in the Czech Republic
- Coordinates: 50°28′0″N 13°14′15″E
- Country: Czech Republic
- Region: Ústí nad Labem
- District: Chomutov
- First mentioned: 1547

Area
  - Total: 30.34 km^{2} (11.71 sq mi)
- Elevation: 750 m (2,460 ft)

Population (2026-01-01)
  - Total: 299
  - Density: 9.85/km^{2} (25.5/sq mi)
- Time zone: UTC+1 (CET)
  - Summer (DST): UTC+2 (CEST)
- Postal code: 431 83
- Website: www.mesto-vysluni.cz

Výsluní (Czech pronunciation: [ˈviːsluɲiː]; until the 1940s Suniperk; German: Sonnenberg) is a town in Chomutov District in the Ústí nad Labem Region of the Czech Republic. It has about 300 inhabitants. The town is located on the stream Prunéřovský potok in the Ore Mountains.

== Administrative division ==
Výsluní consists of six municipal parts (in brackets population according to the 2021 census):

- Výsluní (209)
- Kýšovice (3)
- Sobětice (15)
- Třebíška (10)
- Úbočí (0)
- Volyně (25)

== Etymology ==
The initial German name Sonnenberg means 'sunny mountain'. It refers to the mountain on whose southern slope the settlement was founded. The older Czech name Suniperk was created by transcription. The modern Czech name Výsluní means 'sunny place', 'sunny side'.

== Geography ==
Výsluní is located about 11 kilometres (7 mi) west of Chomutov and 36 km (22 mi) northeast of Karlovy Vary. It briefly borders Germany in the north. It lies in the Ore Mountains. The highest point is at 914 metres (2,999 ft) above sea level. The stream Prunéřovský potok originates in the municipal territory, flows through the town to the east, and then turns to the southwest and forms the municipal border.

== History ==
Výsluní was founded as a mining settlement. Silver, copper, tin and lead ores had been mined in the vicinity of Výsluní since the 14th century. Výsluní itself was founded in the 16th century, the first written mention is from 1547. In 1565, it was referred to as a market town, and in 1584, it became a mining town.

== Demographics ==
Historical population

Year	Pop.	±%
1869	2,631	—
1880	2,617	−0.5%
1890	2,562	−2.1%
1900	2,604	+1.6%
1910	2,722	+4.5%

Year	Pop.	±%
1921	2,280	−16.2%
1930	2,062	−9.6%
1950	427	−79.3%
1961	444	+4.0%
1970	322	−27.5%

Year	Pop.	±%
1980	240	−25.5%
1991	188	−21.7%
2001	207	+10.1%
2011	325	+57.0%
2021	262	−19.4%

Source: Censuses

== Transport ==
Výsluní is located on the railway line Chomutov–Cranzahl. However, trains run on it only on weekends in the summer season.

== Sights ==
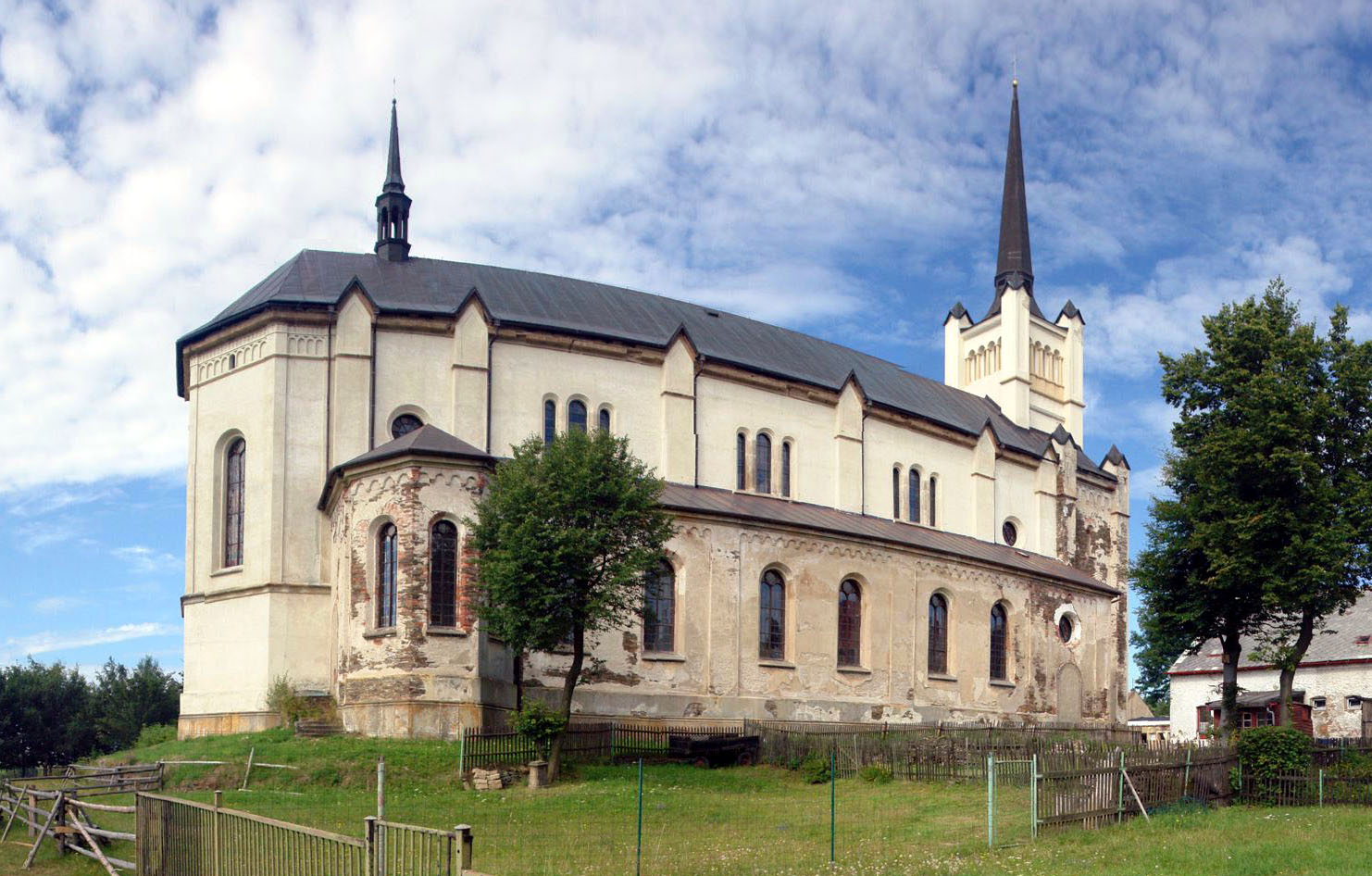
Church of Saint Wenceslaus

The town is known for the Church of Saint Wenceslaus, which is the largest church in the Upper Ore Mountains. It is popularly known as the "Ore Mountains Cathedral". It dominates the town and is visible on the southern slope of the mountains far into the Most Basin.

The town hall is an Empire style building from 1846.

== In popular culture ==
The town's church appeared in many film works: The Borgias, Henri 4, Year of the Devil, Forgotten Light, Thirty Cases of Major Zeman, and Feuer frei! music video.
