= Annaberg-Buchholz–Flöha railway =

Railway line in Germany

Annaberg-Buchholz–Flöha
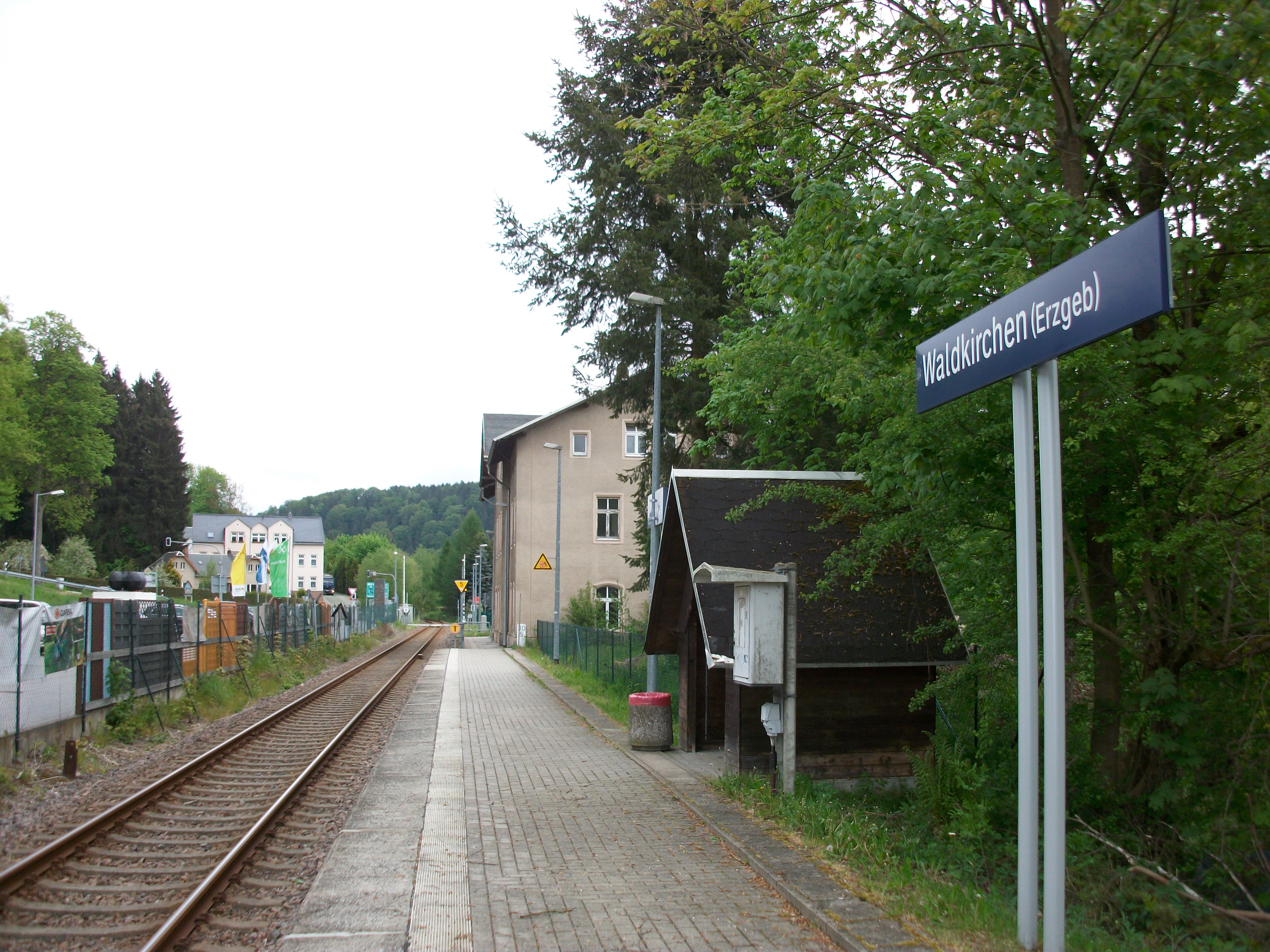
- Annaberg-Buchholz–Flöha railway

Overview
- Native name: Zschopautalbahn
- Line number: 6644
- Locale: Saxony, Germany
- Termini: Annaberg-Buchholz; Flöha

Service
- Route number: 517

Technical
- Line length: 43.51 km (27.04 mi)
- Track gauge: 1,435 mm (4 ft 8 1/2 in) standard gauge
- Minimum radius: 170 m (558 ft)
- Operating speed: 80 km/h (49.7 mph) (maximum)
- Maximum incline: 1.54%

The Annaberg-Buchholz–Flöha railway (German: Bahnstrecke Annaberg-Buchholz unt Bf–Flöha), also called the Zschopau Valley Railway (Zschopautalbahn) is a branch line in the German state of Saxony. It links Annaberg-Buchholz lower station (German: unterer Bahnhof, abbreviated as unt Bf) and the Vejprty–Annaberg-Buchholz railway line to Flöha, running through the Zschopau Valley via Wolkenstein and Zschopau. It has been operated since 2001 by the DB Regio subsidiary Erzgebirgsbahn.

== History ==
In the middle of the 19th century Annaberg was one of the largest cities in Saxony. Citizens of Annaberg founded a railway committee (Eisenbahncomitee) that fought for a connection to the recently established railway network. Initial investigations for a railway connection between Chemnitz and Annaberg began in 1858. At that time Chemnitz already had a rail connection through the Chemnitz–Riesa Railway, completed on 1 September 1852, and the Zwickau-Chemnitz line (known as the Niedererzgebirgische Staatsbahn, that is the Lower Ore Mountains State Railway), which was opened on 15 November 1858. Another possible starting point for a line to Annaberg was Schwarzenberg, which since 1858 had been the terminus of the Upper Ore Mountains Railway (Obererzgebirgische Bahn).

Eventually the Saxon government chose Chemnitz as the starting point. There was initial disagreement on the route. The choice between the route via Flöha and Zschopau through the Zschopau valley or a more direct route via Thum and Ehrenfriedersdorf. Decisive in favour of the route through the Zschopau valley, ultimately approved in 1860, was the industry located there, which promised a higher volume of traffic.

On 3 September 1862, construction began on the line as the Chemnitz-Annaberger State Railway (Chemnitz-Annaberger Staatseisenbahn) and it was opened on 1 February 1866.

=== Operations ===
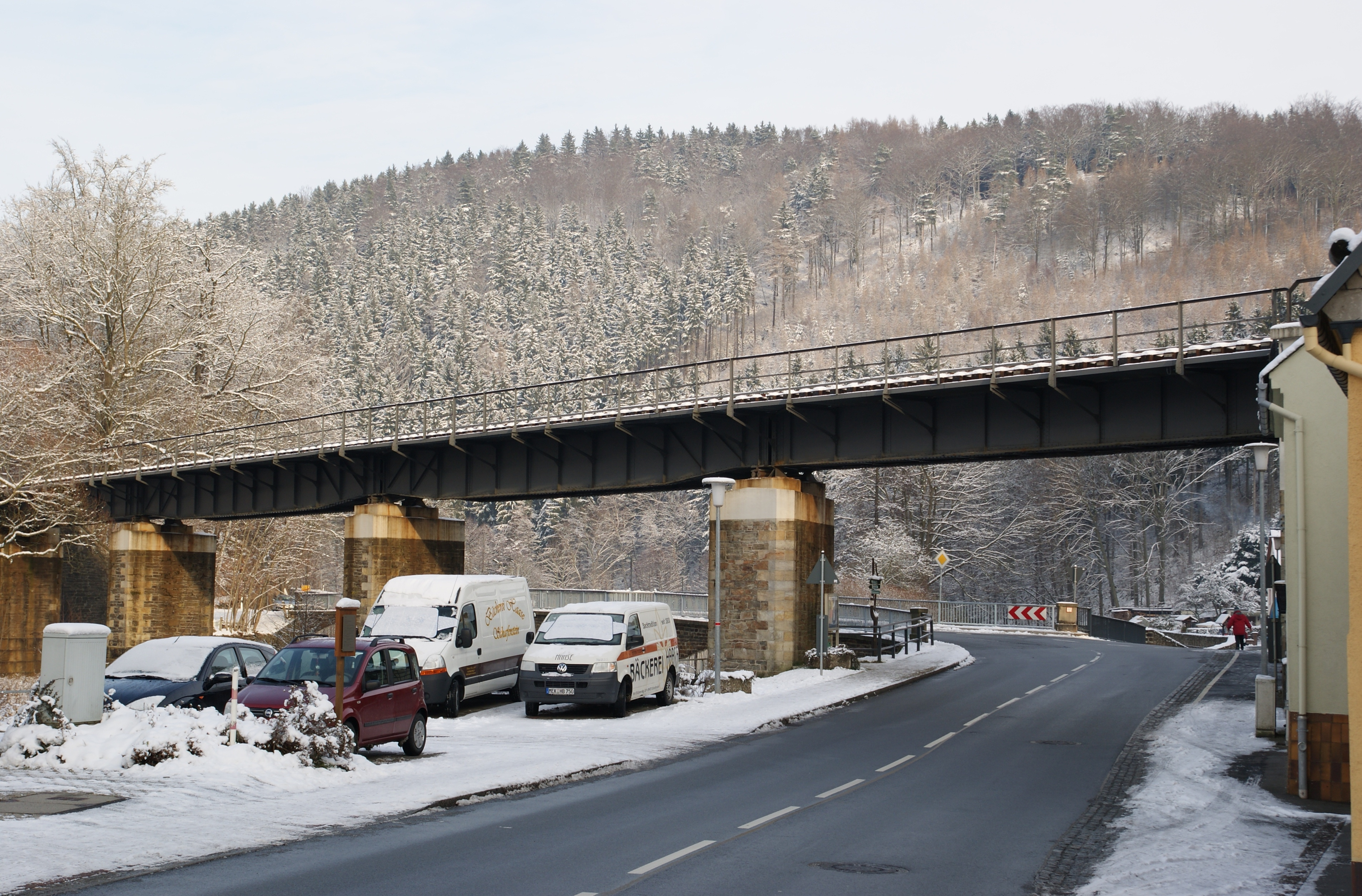
Zschopau bridge Scharfenstein

In 1869, the section between Flöha and Chemnitz became part of the Dresden–Freiberg–Chemnitz–Werdau line.

Since 1 January 2002, the route has been operated as part of the network of Erzgebirgsbahn, a subsidiary of DB Regio. In passenger traffic fares are regulated by the Verkehrsverbund Mittelsachsen (Transport Association of Central Saxony).

=== Modernisation ===
In 2007, the section between Annaberg-Buchholz lower station and Erdmannsdorf–Augustusburg was closed from April to December for extensive refurbishment. Buses provided replacement services.

A difficult part of the second phase of construction was the construction of the electronic interlocking at Annaberg-Buchholz. Electronically controlled devices were installed in Wolkenstein, Zschopau and Hennersdorf. Since completion, all train operations on the line have been controlled from Annaberg-Buchholz. 16 level crossings were modified, some stations were modernised, bridges were rehabilitated and tracks were renewed.

In addition, new halts were established in Flöha-Plaue and Zschopau Ost and the Schoenfeld-Wiesa station was replaced by a halt at Wiesa. At the remaining stations are programmed to be modernised and the platforms will be made accessible for the disabled.

All passenger trains on the Zschopautalbahn (Zschopau Valley Railway) service are currently operated with Siemens Desiro (class 642) diesel multiple units. The service continues via Flöha to Chemnitz, where there are more connections to the surrounding area. The trains run at least every two hours every day; the section between Chemnitz Central Station and Annaberg-Buchholz lower station runs almost hourly on weekdays. On weekends an excursion train runs directly to and from Leipzig.

== Route ==
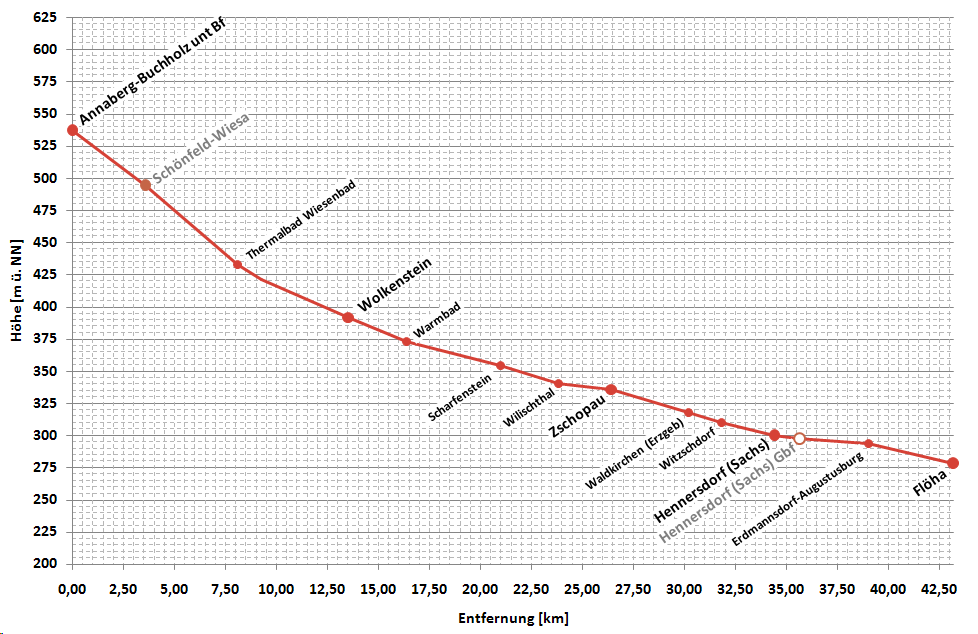
Simplified altitude profile of the line

Chainages on the line are measured from the original end of the Chemnitz-Annaberger line, which is 301 metres (988 ft) south of Annaberg-Buchholz lower station. From there the line runs on the eastern bank of the Sehma to just south of Wiesa and then follows the Zschopau valley down to Flöha. There it joins the Dresden–Werdau main line.

At the station of Erdmannsdorf-Augustusburg, the line connects with the Augustusburg Cable Railway, a funicular railway that links to the town of Augustusburg on the hill above.

=== Operating points ===
==== Annaberg-Buchholz lower station ====
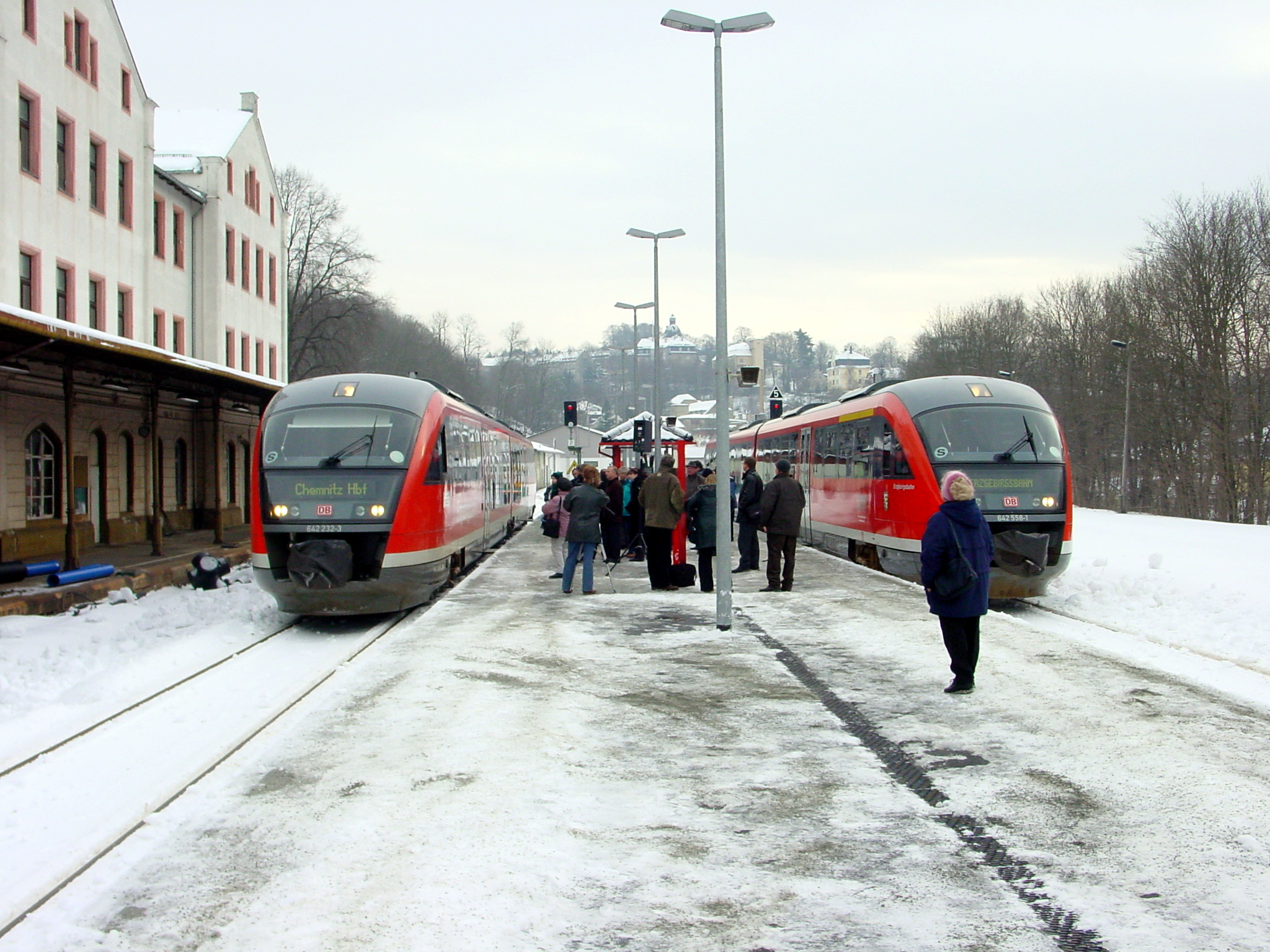
Annaberg-Buchholz lower station (2006)

The Annaberg-Buchholz lower station is the original terminus of the Chemnitz–Annaberg line. The once extensive facilities of the station were dismantled during the reconstruction of the line and now has only two tracks. The impressive station building is now unused.

==== Schönfeld-Wiesa station ====
The now disused Schönfeld-Wiesa station was formerly the station for changing trains to the Schönfeld-Wiesa-Thum line of the narrow-gauge Thumer Netz. In 2007, it was closed down in favour of the newly established Wiesa (Erzgeb) halt. Today only the station building and freight shed are left of the former extensive infrastructure.

==== Wiesa (Erzgeb) halt ====
Wiesa (Erzgeb) halt was established in 2007.

==== Thermalbad Wiesenbad halt ====
The halt is located in the district of Thermalbad Wiesenbad in the district of Wiesenbad of the municipality of Thermalbad Wiesenbad. The halt was opened on 1 February 1866 as Wiesenbad halt simultaneously with the railway line. On 1 May 1905 it was reclassified as a station. On 3 June 1956 was renamed Thermalbad Wiesenbad. On 10 December 1997, the station was reclassified as a halt. The entrance hall of the station with its unique wooden overpass to the former island platform is now a heritage-listed building.

==== Plattenthal junction ====
The Platten Valley Railway branched off at Plattenthal junction on the open line from 1914 to 1990; this was an industrial railway serving the Platten Valley. This little-known railway ran to Königswalde until 1945 and was served during the Second World War by passenger trains.

==== Wolkenstein station ====
From 1892 to 1986 the narrow-gauge Wolkenstein–Jöhstadt line ran to Jöhstadt from Wolkenstein.

==== Warmbad halt ====
The Warmbad halt is located in the district of Floßplatz in the municipality of Wolkenstein. It was built simultaneously with the line and is still in operation. It formerly served as a station for the Warmbad spa. It was called Floßplatz halt until 30 September 1904, when it was renamed Floßplatz-Warmbad. On 1 April 1940, it was renamed Wolkenstein-Warmbad. It has been called Warmbad since 2 October 1960.

==== Scharfstein halt ====
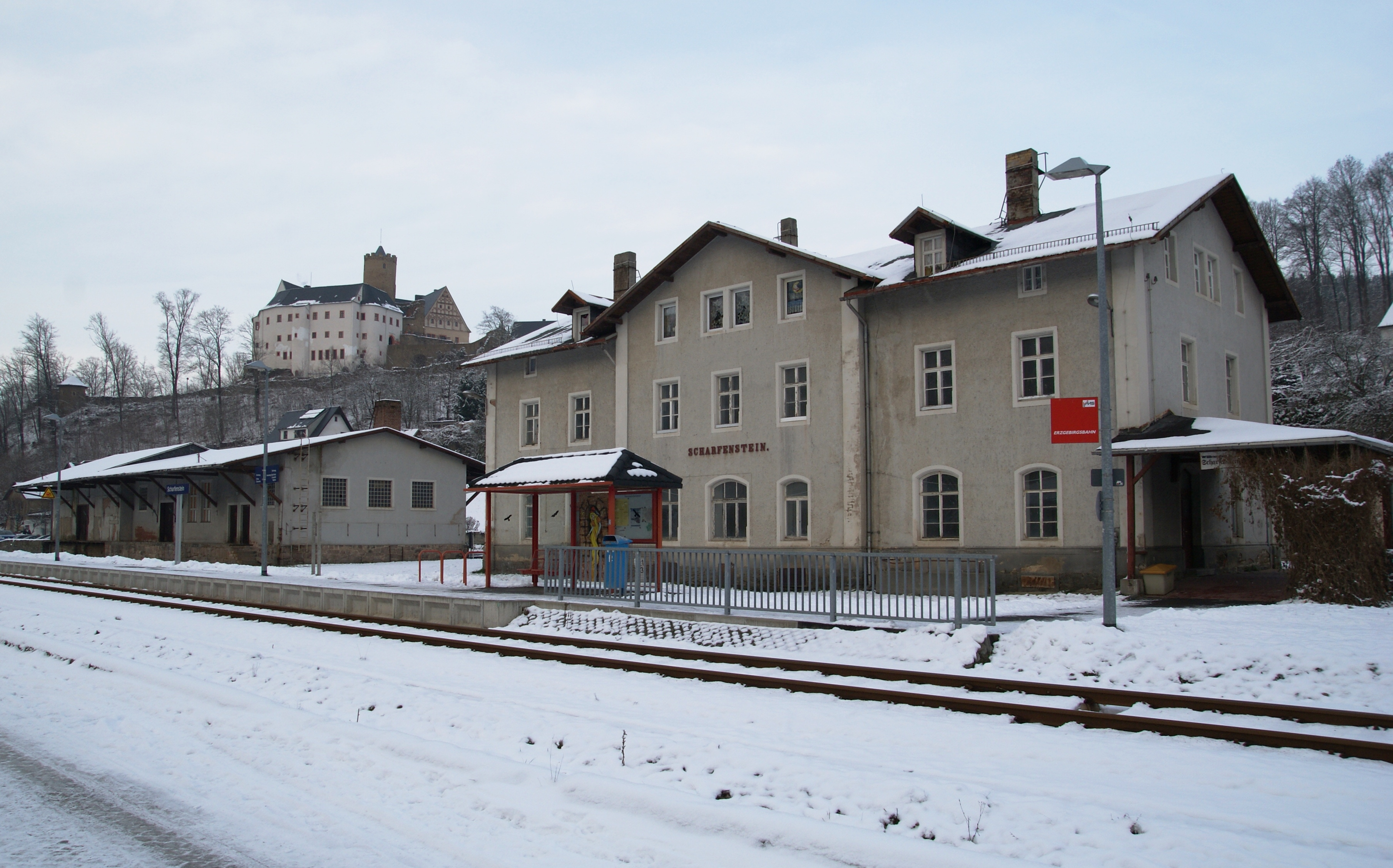
Scharfenstein station (2010)

Scharfstein halt is located in the Scharfstein district of the municipality of Drebach. It was opened with the line on 1 February 1866. Freight traffic was recorded at the station on 1 January 1875. In the 1990s and 2000s, the sidings were gradually removed until only main line was left and the station was reclassified as a halt.

==== Wilischthal halt ====
Until 1972, Wilischthal was a station for changing to the narrow-gauge Wilischthal–Thum line at Wilischthal. As part of the reconstruction of the line in 2007, Wilischthal was rebuilt as a halt.

==== Flöha station ====
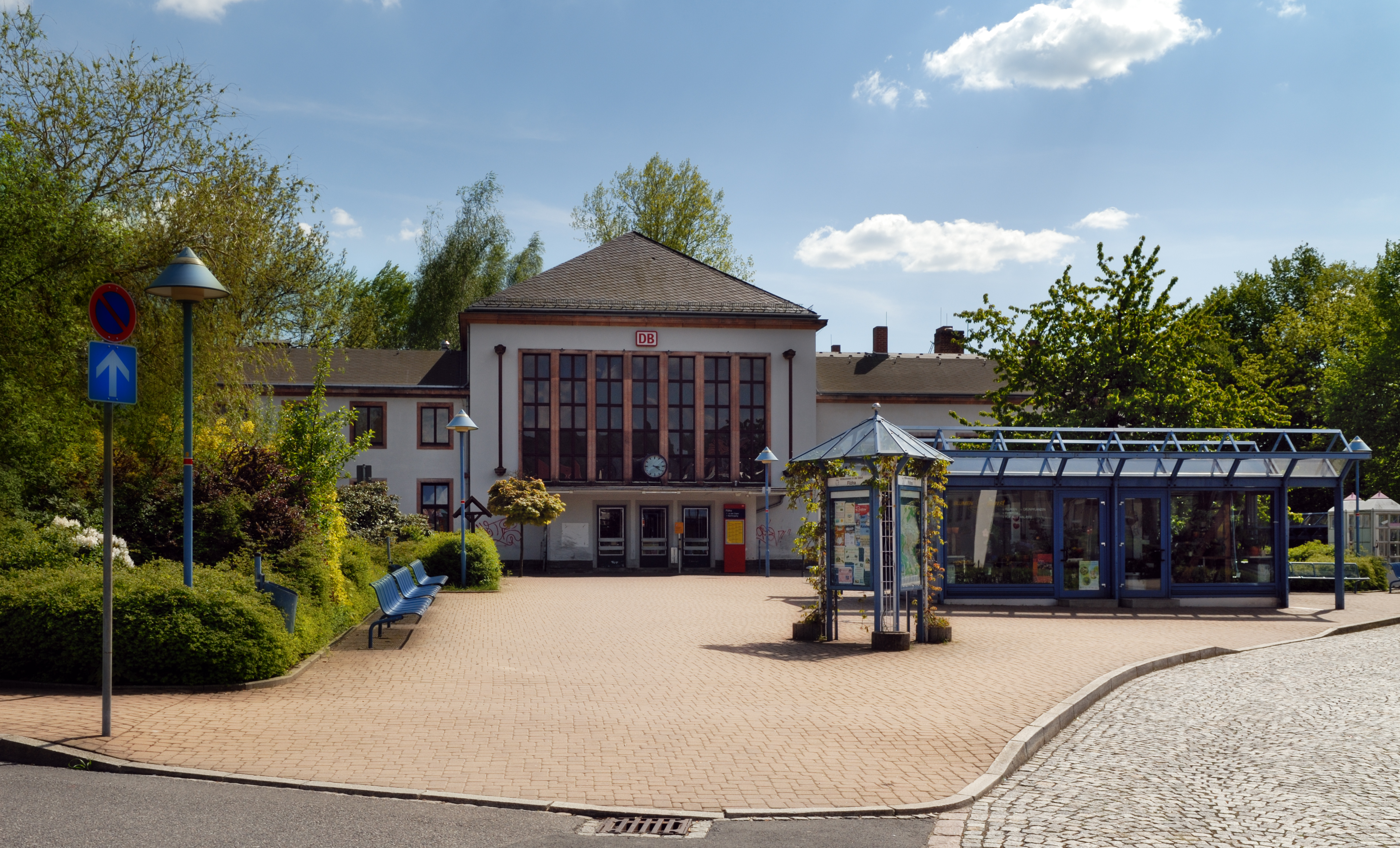
Flöha station (2003)

During the building of the line towards Freiberg, a completely new station was built in the northeast part of the facilities. With the construction of the Reitzenhain–Flöha railway another station was built still further to the northeast of the station by the Chemnitz-Komotau Railway Company (Chemnitz-Komotauer Eisenbahngesellschaft). The current impressive station building was built during a major renovation of the station in the 1930s.

== Literature ==
- Siegfried Bergelt (2005). Die Zschopautalbahn und ihre regelspurigen Zweigstrecken (in German) (2. revised ed.). Witzschdorf: Bildverlag Böttger. ISBN 3-9806606-9-9.
- Erich Preuß, Rainer Preuß (1991). Sächsische Staatseisenbahnen (in German). Berlin: transpress Verlagsgesellschaft. ISBN 3-344-70700-0.
