= Erzgebirgsbahn =

German railway company

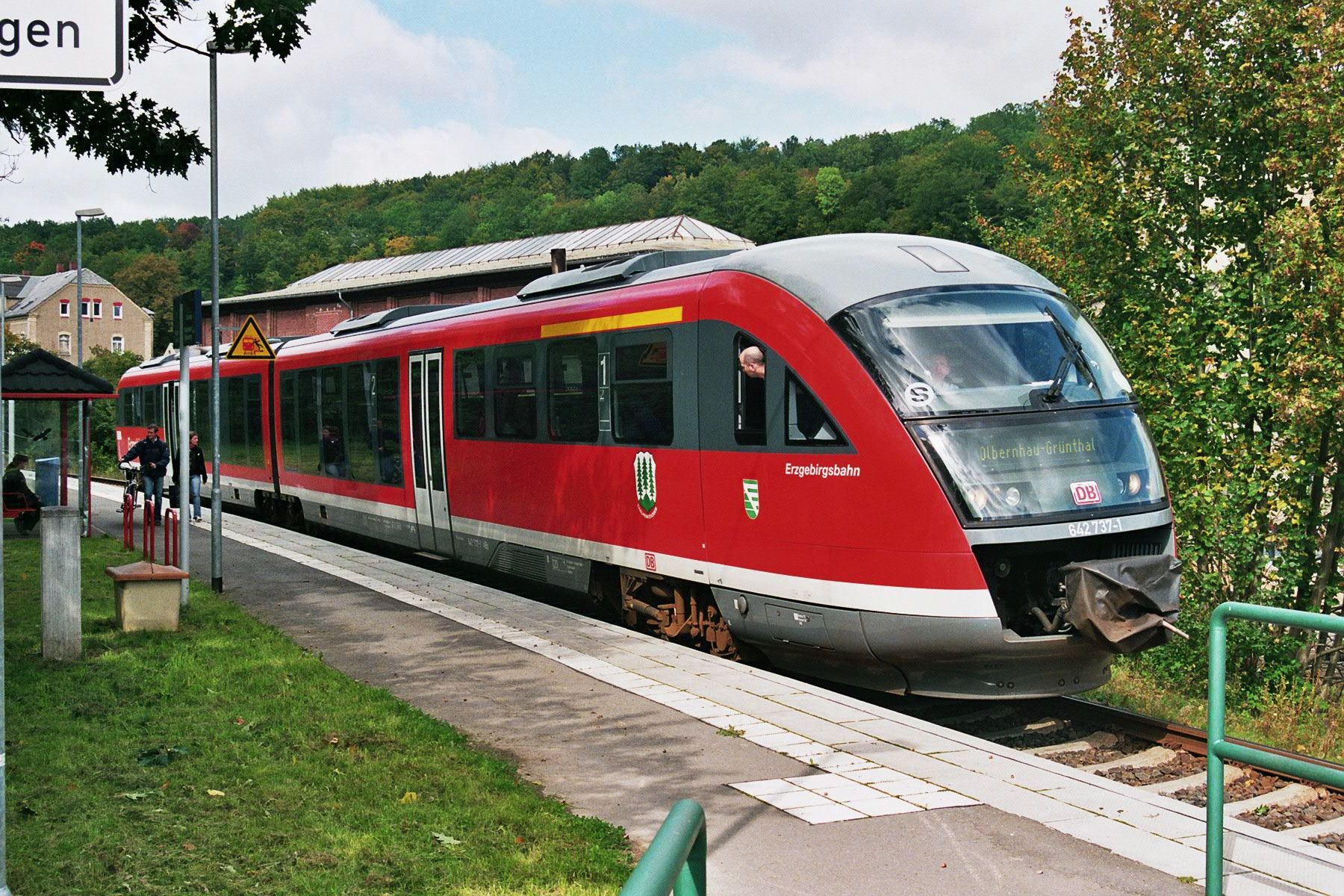
- A modern railcar along Reitzenhain–Flöha railway
- Industry: Rail transport
- Headquarters: Chemnitz
- Area served: c. 2,500 km^{2}
- Owner: DB RegioNetz
- Number of employees: 260 (2005)
- Website: www.erzgebirgsbahn.de
- Footnotes; Rail gauge: 1,435 mm Railway lines: Annaberg-Buchholz–Flöha; Marienberg–Flöha; Vejprty–Annaberg-Buchholz; Pockau-Lengefeld–Neuhausen; Chemnitz–Aue; Zwickau–Schwarzenberg; Johanngeorgenstadt–Schwarzenberg; Annaberg-Buchholz Süd–Schwarzenberg; Locomotives: 1 diesel locomotive (202 646-6); Railcars: 16 railcars (VT642); Passengers: 4,600 daily Stations: 68 Length of network: 217 km

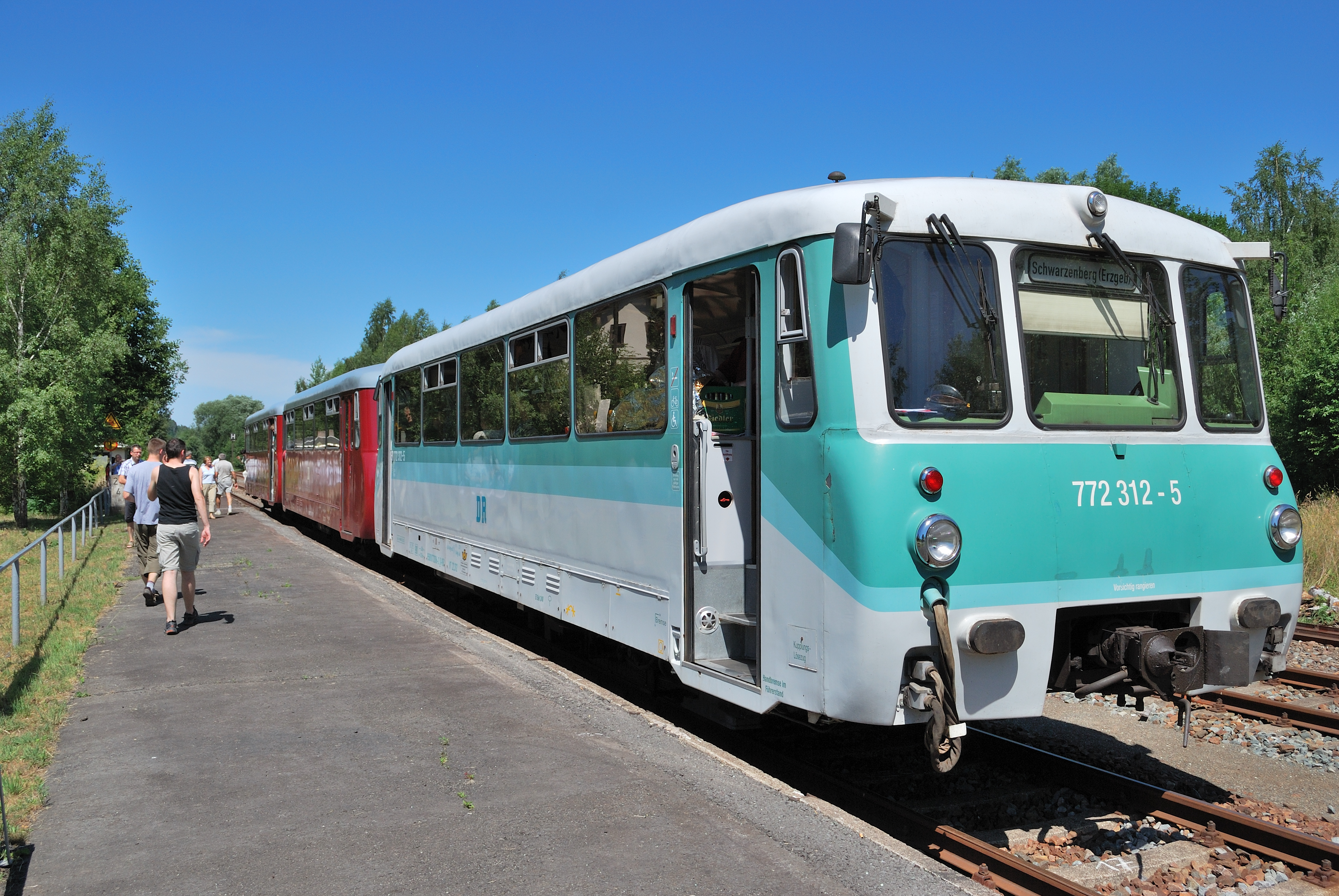
A historical train along Erzgebirgsbahn's Annaberg-Buchholz–Schwarzenberg railway line

The Erzgebirgsbahn (sometimes abbreviated as EGB) is a German railway company and a RegioNetz subsidiary of Deutsche Bahn. It operates in the Ore Mountains (German: Erzgebirge) region of southern Saxony, near the towns of Chemnitz and Zwickau.

The company is responsible for maintaining and operating services over five railway lines:

The company also used to operate the Augustusburg Cable Railway, a funicular railway that connects Erdmannsdorf-Augustusburg on the Annaberg-Buchholz–Flöha railway with the town of Augustusburg from 2006 until 2015.

== Profile ==
The company is based in Chemnitz. The company has a total of around 260 employees (as of the beginning of 2009). The contract to spin off the company from Deutsche Bahn was signed on April 26, 2001. It is the second regional network of the DB after the Kurhessenbahn. Today around 150 trains run daily on the Erzgebirgsbahn network. Between 2002 and the beginning of 2008, the number of daily passengers increased from around 1200 to around 4600. According to its own information, the company has been leading the customer satisfaction statistics of the Deutsche Bahn rail transport companies since July 2002 (as of early 2008). In 2017 the number of passengers was 5200 per day, 252 employees worked for the company.

The contract with the Central Saxony transport association for the provision of local rail transport services in the “Erzgebirgsnetz” was extended on June 24, 2016, at the previous conditions until the timetable change in June 2021.

The contract with Verkehrsverbund Mittelsachsen for the provision of regional rail services in the "Erzgebirge diesel network" was last extended in June 2021 until the timetable change in June 2024 with the same service volume.

According to information from the end of September 2022, the Erzgebirgsbahn was due to cease operations at the end of July 2024. The Verkehrsverbund Mittelsachsen had planned to award a direct contract for the continuation of the Erzgebirgsbahn's services on the RB 80, 81 and 95 lines, but this failed, as the Erzgebirgsbahn had not submitted a bid for a contract beyond July 31, 2024. The routes from Chemnitz to Cranzahl and Olbernhau-Grünthal were to be operated by City-Bahn Chemnitz from August 1, 2024. A takeover by Die Länderbahn was planned for the RB 95 line (Zwickau-Johanngeorgenstadt).

On June 23, 2023, the Verkehrsverbund Mittelsachsen (VMS) announced that the Erzgebirgsbahn will now continue to operate the lines from July 2024 after all. The VMS has awarded a direct contract to Erzgebirgsbahn on the basis of a new offer. This means that the Erzgebirgsbahn will continue to operate the RB80, 81 and 95 lines beyond 2024.

== Railway lines ==
- Chemnitz – Flöha – Erdmannsdorf-Augustusburg – Hennersdorf – Wolkenstein – Annaberg-Buchholz – Cranzahl – Bärenstein – Vejprty
  - Annaberg-Buchholz–Flöha railway
  - German section of Vejprty–Annaberg-Buchholz railway
- Chemnitz – Flöha – Falkenau – Pockau-Lengefeld – Olbernhau/Marienberg.
  - Active section of Reitzenhain–Flöha railway
  - Pockau-Lengefeld–Neuhausen railway
- Chemnitz – Thalheim – Zwönitz – Aue.
  - Longest active section of Chemnitz–Adorf railway
- Zwickau – Aue – Schwarzenberg – Johanngeorgenstadt.
  - Zwickau–Schwarzenberg railway
  - Johanngeorgenstadt–Schwarzenberg railway
- Annaberg-Buchholz – Schwarzenberg
  - Annaberg-Buchholz–Schwarzenberg railway
