= Augustusburg Cable Railway =

Funicular railway in Saxony, Germany

Coordinates: 50.819005°N 13.091497°E

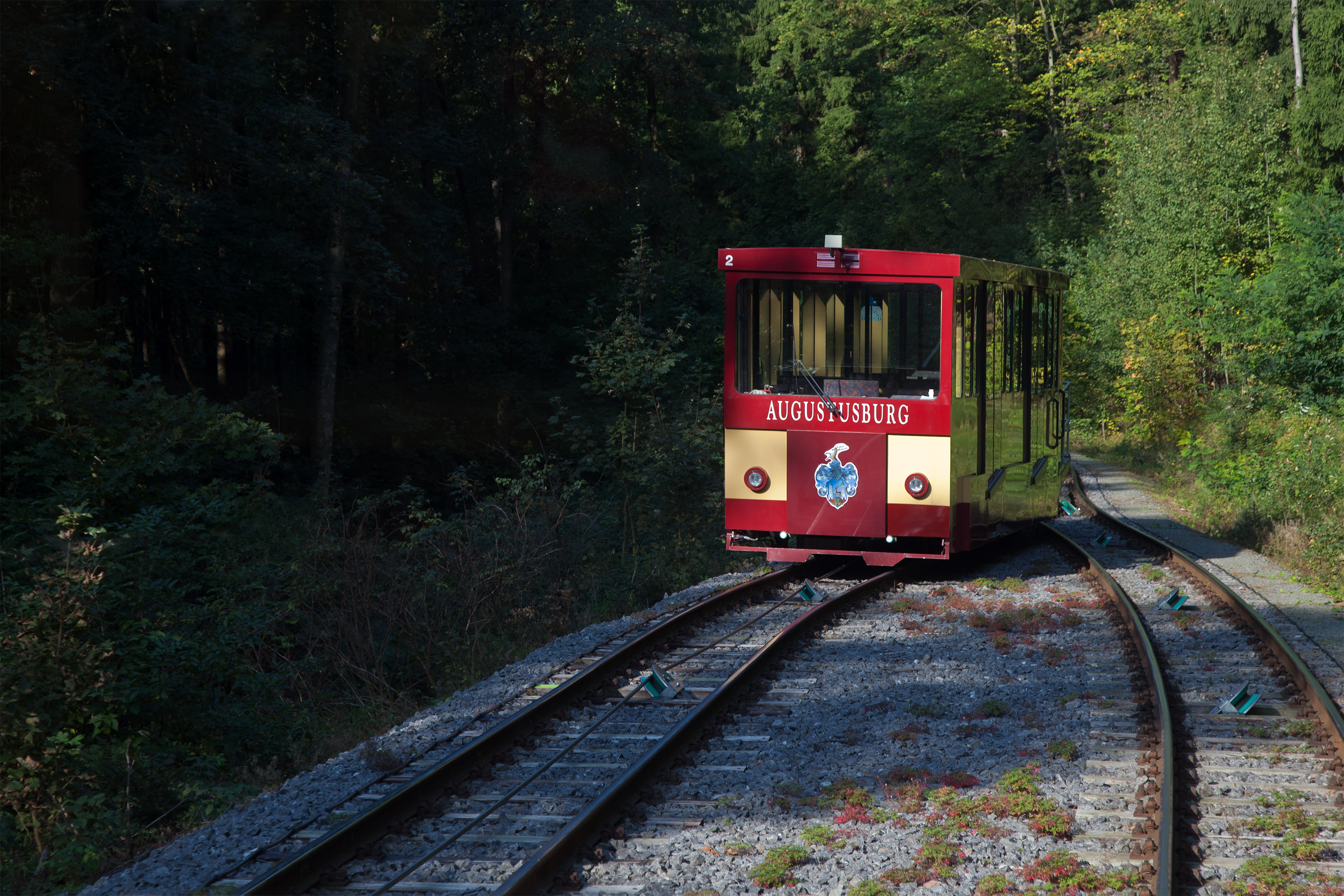
Car at passing loop

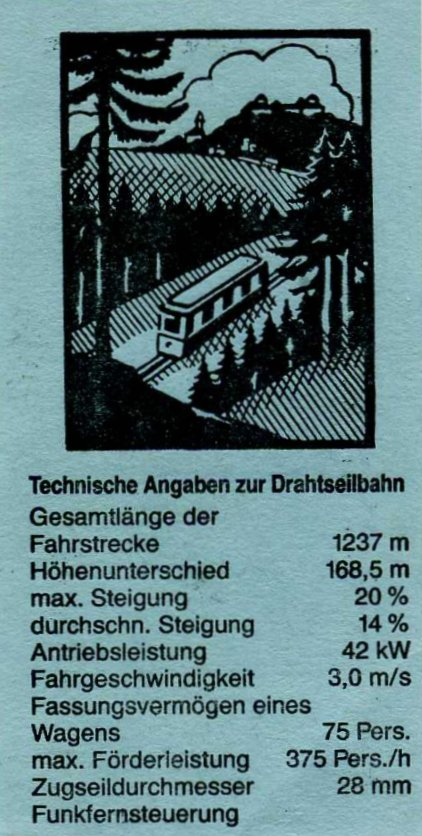
Reverse of ticket

The Augustusburg Cable Railway (German: Drahtseilbahn Augustusburg) is a funicular railway in Saxony, Germany. It connects the station of Erdmannsdorf-Augustusburg, in the village of Erdmannsdorf and on the Annaberg-Buchholz–Flöha railway, with the town of Augustusburg on the hill above.

The need for a line to connect Augustusburg with its railway station was identified in the 19th century, with the growth of local tourism, but negotiation for granting a franchise took some years. The franchise was finally granted in 1910, and the line was opened in 1911. The line has been overhauled and restored several times, including 1971–73, 1996 and 2005–2006. New cars were provided in 1996. The stations have been kept in their historical condition, and are on the list of national monuments.

The line has the following technical parameters:

- Length: 1,239 metres (4,065 ft)
- Height: 168 metres (551 ft)
- Maximum Steepness: 20%
- Cars: 2
- Capacity: 77 passengers per car
- Configuration: Single track with passing loop
- Maximum speed: 3 metres per second (9.8 ft/s)
- Track gauge: 1,000 mm (3 ft 3 3/8 in)
- Journey time: 8 minutes
- Traction: Electricity

The line is operated by Deutsche Bahn's subsidiary Erzgebirgsbahn, who also operate the nearby Annaberg-Buchholz–Flöha railway.

== See also ==
- List of funicular railways
