= Herbert Jobst =

German writer (1915–1990)

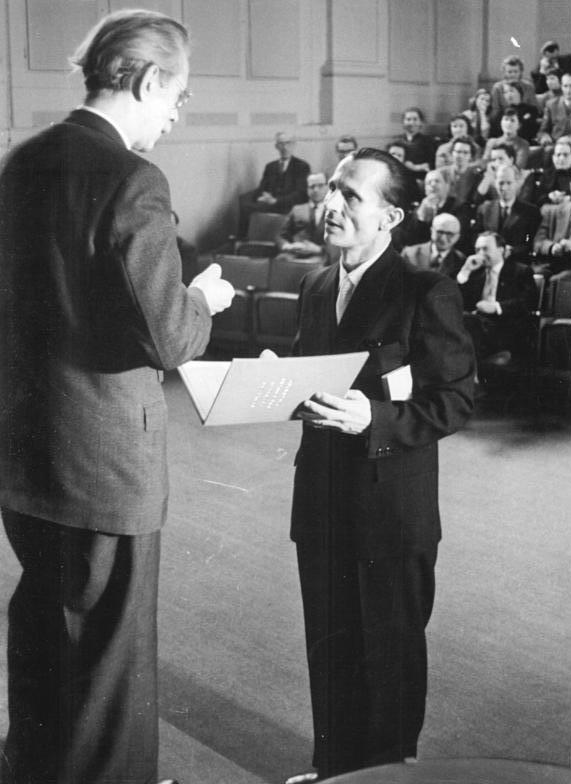
Herbert Jobst (right).

Herbert Jobst (July 30, 1915 – June 28, 1990) was a German writer.

== Life ==
Herbert Jobst was the son of a miner from Neu-Welzow, Lusatia who died in World War I. As a small child, he would be abandoned by his mother in Radeberg and spend his youth in homes and with different foster parents. After his attendance of the Volksschule, he completed training as a printer in Meissen. In the following years, he became a member of the Sozialistische Arbeiter-Jugend (Socialist Worker Youth) the Roten Falken (Red Falcons) and Naturfreunde (Nature Friends). He would be drafted to the labour service for the "Nazi Re-education". In 1934, Jobst went to Austria, Italy and Yugoslavia, where he led the life of a vagabond and he survived by begging, provisional money of the printers guild and casual work for water. The Austrian authorities deported him into the German Reich in 1937 where he would be drafted into the Wehrmacht however because of the Wehrkraftzersetzung (subversion of military strength) he was quickly sent to the Military Prison Torgau. With the breakout of World War II, he received casual work at the so-called Frontbewährung (Front Probation). Jobst participated as a soldier of the Wehrmacht at the Eastern Front and would be imprisoned in Heiligenbeil, East Prussia as a Soviet prisoner of war. Until 1947, he worked in Tscheljabinsk, Siberia in the Camp 8 coal mine. He returned to Germany in 1947, starting as a night watchman in Dresden. From 1948 to 1956 he worked for Wismut-AG beginning as a miner and extraction man. Since he completed a study at the Technische Universität Bergakademie Freiberg in 1952/53, he was promoted to climber. After his first writing attempt, he would become a member of the Arbeitsgemeinschaft Junger Autoren. In 1957 he moved to Flöha, Saxony making a living as a writer and then lived Neustrelitz from 1967 until his death in 1990. He would marry lyrical poet Lisa Jobst.

Herbert Jobst was a writer of novels, narratives and screenplays. His best known work was the much read in East Germany, being the powerful autobiographical colored Novel Tetralogy Der dramatische Lebensweg des Adam Probst (The Dramatic Way of Life of Adam Probst). In them, the author tells the life story of a social outcast who endures Simplicius Simplicissimus thing, above all in the group Der Vagabund, in a popular, humor filled to satirical tone.

Herbert Jobst received the 1958 Heinrich Mann Prize and the 1965 Kunstpreis des Bezirkes Karl-Marx-Stadt in addition to the Free German Trade Union Federation Prize and Fritz Reuter Prize the same year.

== Works ==
- Der Findling, Berlin 1957
- Der Zögling, Berlin 1959
- Der Vagabund, Berlin 1963
- Blick auf Irdisches, Rostock 1969 (together with Klaus Beuchler and Egon Richter)
- Der Glücksucher, Berlin 1973
- Tapetenwechsel, Berlin 1983

== Literature ==
- Anita Heiden-Berndt (Editor): Herbert Jobst, Neubrandenburg 1981
- Stephan Gruner: Im Streit um die Geschichte, Berlin 1989
