= Cranzahl station =

Railway station in Sehmatal, Germany

Cranzahl
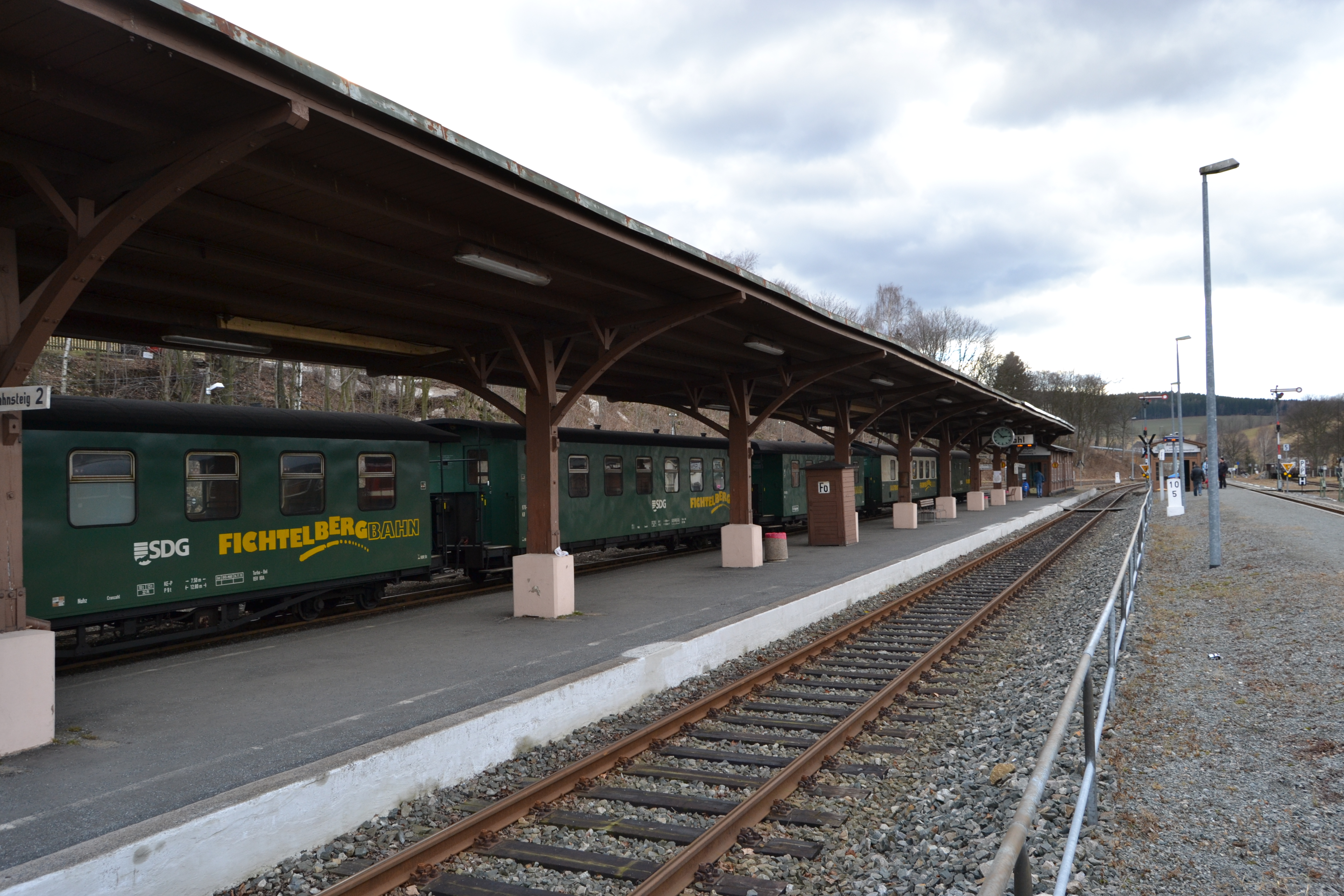
- 2014

General information
- Location: Bahnhofstraße 4; 09465 Sehmatal; Saxony; Germany
- Coordinates: 50.5112°N 12.9929°E
- Elevation: 654 m (2,146 ft)
- Owner: DB Netz
- Operator: DB Station&Service
- Lines: Vejprty–Annaberg-Buchholz railway (KBS 517); Fichtelberg Railway (KBS 518)
- Platforms: 1 island platform 1 side platform
- Tracks: 3
- Train operators: Erzgebirgsbahn; Sächsische Dampfeisenbahngesellschaft; České dráhy

Other information
- Station code: 1080
- DS100 code: DCR
- IBNR: 8010074
- Category: 6
- Website: www.bahnhof.de

History
- Opened: 1872; 154 years ago

Services
Preceding station	Erzgebirgsbahn	Following station
Sehma towards Chemnitz Hbf	RB 80	Terminus
Preceding station	České dráhy	Following station
Terminus	Os Limited service	Bärenstein (Annaberg) towards Chomutov
Preceding station	Saxon Steam Railway Company	Following station
Terminus	Fichtelbergbahn	Unterneudorf towards Kurort Oberwiesenthal
Location
- Location within Saxony

Cranzahl station is a railway station in the municipality of Cranzahl, located in the Erzgebirgskreis district in Saxony, Germany.
