= Augustusburg =

- Town
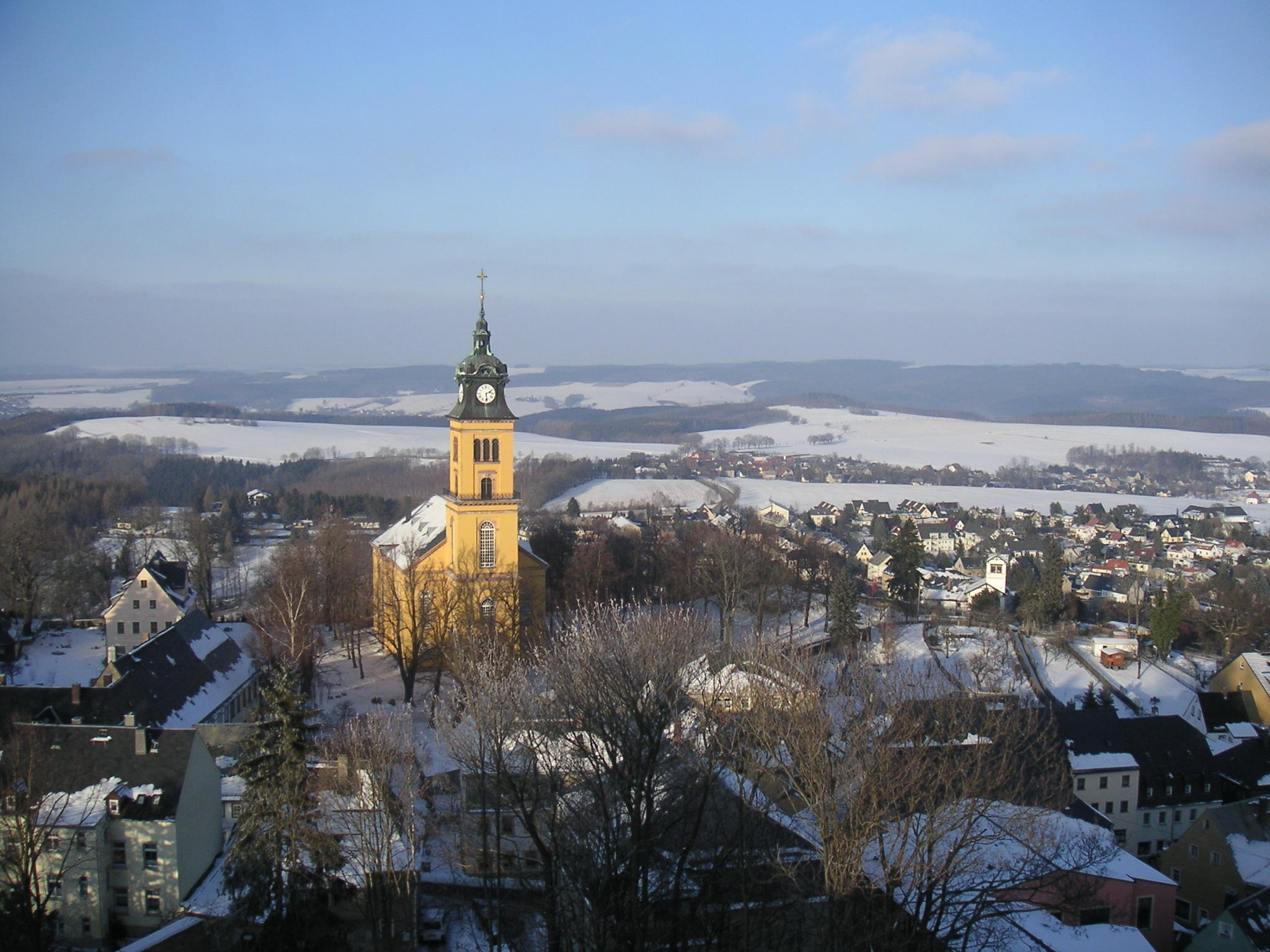

- Coat of arms

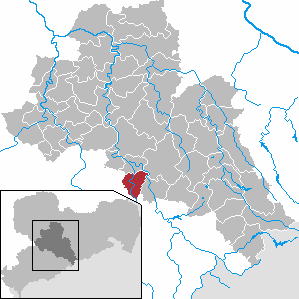
- Location of Augustusburg within Mittelsachsen district
- Interactive map of Augustusburg
- Location within Germany Location within Saxony
- Coordinates: 50°48′52″N 13°06′00″E
- Country: Germany
- State: Saxony
- District: Mittelsachsen

Government
  - Mayor (2023–30): Jens Schmidt

Area
  - Total: 23.38 km^{2} (9.03 sq mi)
- Elevation: 516 m (1,693 ft)

Population (2025-12-31)
  - Total: 4,297
  - Density: 183.8/km^{2} (476.0/sq mi)
- Time zone: UTC+01:00 (CET)
  - Summer (DST): UTC+02:00 (CEST)
- Postal codes: 09573
- Dialling codes: 037291
- Vehicle registration: FG
- Website: augustusburg.de

Augustusburg (German pronunciation: [aʊˈɡʊstʊsbʊɐ̯k]) is a town in the district of Mittelsachsen, in Saxony, Germany. It is situated 12 km east of Chemnitz. Augustusburg is known for its Jagdschloss, the hunting lodge of the same name.

The town includes the ortsteil or town quarters of:

- Augustusburg
- Erdmannsdorf
- Grünberg
- Hennersdorf
- Kunnersdorf

A funicular railway, the Augustusburg Cable Railway, connects Erdmannsdorf-Augustusburg station, in the village of Erdmannsdorf and on the Zschopau Valley Railway, with the town.

== Geography ==
=== Location ===
Augustusburg is located in the Ore Mountains (Erzgebirge), approx. 15 km east of Chemnitz, 5 km south east of Flöha, 20 km south west of Freiberg and 9 km north of Zschopau in the district of Mittelsachsen.

=== Situation ===
Augustusburg is situated on a ridge between the valleys Zschopau and the Flöha rivers. The town is primarily surrounded by forests. The highest point is the Schellenberg, at 516 m on which the castle is found. The lowest point is the Zschopautal at about 300 m.

== History ==
=== Historical Population ===
The following population figures correspond to the population as of 31 December of each year within the municipality borders of January 2007:

1982 to 1988

- 1982 – 5,770
- 1983 – 5,704
- 1984 – 5,659
- 1985 – 5,648
- 1986 – 5,639
- 1987 – 5,618
- 1988 – 5,555

1989 to 1995

- 1989 – 5,408
- 1990 – 5,297
- 1991 – 5,208
- 1992 – 5,186
- 1993 – 5.207
- 1994 – 5,139
- 1995 – 5,061

1996 to 2002

- 1996 – 4,998
- 1997 – 5,121
- 1998 – 5,195
- 1999 – 5,283
- 2000 – 5,332
- 2001 – 5,345
- 2002 – 5,232

2003 to 2007

- 2003 – 5,218
- 2004 – 5,225
- 2005 – 5,219
- 2006 – 5,152
- 2007 – 5,055

Source: Official Statistical Office of the Free State of Saxony
