= Thalheim, Saxony =

Thalheim
- Town
- Coat of arms

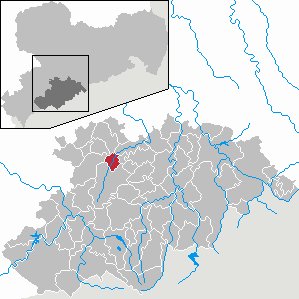
- Location of Thalheim within Erzgebirgskreis district
- Interactive map of Thalheim
- Location within Germany Location within Saxony
- Coordinates: 50°42′09″N 12°51′06″E
- Country: Germany
- State: Saxony
- District: Erzgebirgskreis

Government
  - Mayor (2020–27): Nico Dittmann

Area
  - Total: 10.79 km^{2} (4.17 sq mi)
- Elevation: 450 m (1,480 ft)

Population (2025-12-31)
  - Total: 5,899
  - Density: 546.7/km^{2} (1,416/sq mi)
- Time zone: UTC+01:00 (CET)
  - Summer (DST): UTC+02:00 (CEST)
- Postal codes: 09380
- Dialling codes: 03721
- Vehicle registration: ERZ, ANA, ASZ, AU, MAB, MEK, STL, SZB, ZP
- Website: www.thalheim-erzgeb.de

Thalheim (German pronunciation: [ˈtaːlhaɪm]) is a town in the Erzgebirgskreis district, in the Free State of Saxony, Germany, 5 km east of Stollberg, and 16 km south of Chemnitz.
