= Reitzenhain–Flöha railway =

Railway line in Germany

Flöha–Reitzenhain railway
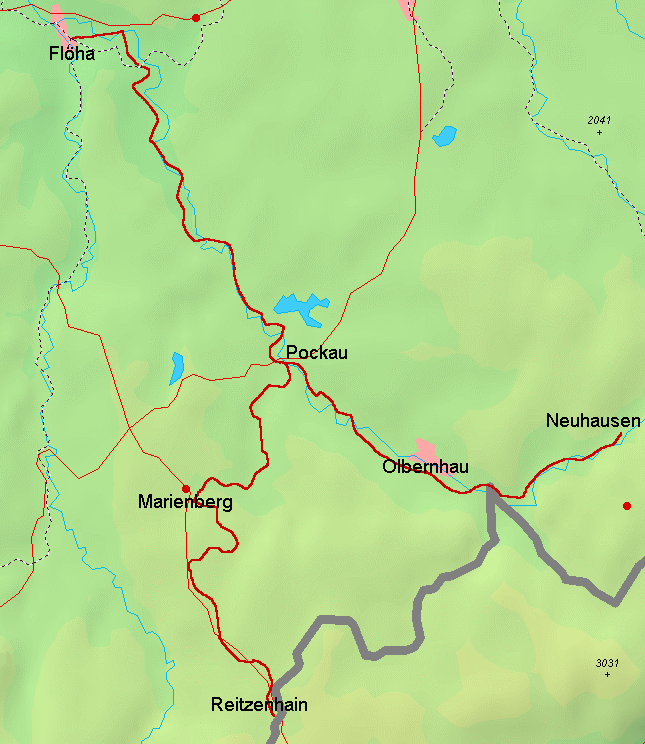
- Route map for the Flöha Valley Railway

Overview
- Line number: 6619
- Locale: Saxony, Germany

Service
- Route number: 519

Technical
- Line length: 57.92 km (35.99 mi)
- Track gauge: 1,435 mm (4 ft 8 1/2 in) standard gauge
- Minimum radius: 224 m (735 ft)
- Operating speed: 80 km/h (49.7 mph)
- Maximum incline: 2.0%

The Reitzenhain–Flöha railway, one of two lines also called the Flöha Valley Railway (German: Flöhatalbahn), is a branch line in Saxony in East Germany. It links the city of Chemnitz with Flöha, Lengefeld, Pockau, Olbernhau and Marienberg, formerly also Neuhausen/Erzgeb. and Reitzenhain and runs through the valleys of the Flöha and the Black Pockau. The line belongs today to DB Regio-Netz Erzgebirgsbahn.

== History ==
=== Origins ===
A railway into the upper Flöha valley and to Marienberg was already under consideration in 1863, when the construction of the railway between Chemnitz and Freiberg was discussed. A more southern route than the present one was intended for the latter in order to connect the municipalities in the Ore Mountains to the emerging railway network. When these plans were abandoned, support was solicited for a line in the Flöha Valley via Olbernhau to Komotau. At the same time, a committee in Marienberg supported the construction of a railway via Marienberg and Reitzenhain to Komotau. Thus, in 1867 there were two projects competing projects for the concession to build a railway in the Flöha Valley. After the Buschtěhrader Eisenbahn and the city of Komotau expressed their preference for the route via Marienberg, this was given priority. The Saxon government approved of the concession with the condition that the line was to be built from private, i.e. non-government funds. The agreement with Austria-Hungary on the border checkpoint was signed in 1869.

The Chemnitz-Komotauer Eisenbahngesellschaft (Chemnitz-Komotau railway company) was formed on 15 August 1871 with the aims of constructing and operating the line. The railway construction company Pleßner & Co. of Berlin was tasked with the execution of the construction work.

=== Construction and opening ===
The ground-breaking ceremony took place on 22 February 1872. To facilitate a speedy construction, work started on five sections at the same time.

Due to the difficult terrain in the narrow valleys of the Black Pockau and Red Pockau, tracks in these sections were mainly laid on embankments and bridges. All bridges and viaducts were prepared for a double-tracked line, while cuttings were only blasted wide enough for a single track, which can still be seen today.

All in all, about 1.6 million m³ of excavated material had to be moved. Italian workers also took part in the construction because of their extensive experience in stonework. The economical crisis of 1873 caused economical difficulties for the construction company, so that the railway company was forced to take over the completion. Construction of the railway was finished in early 1875.

The first locomotive reached Marienberg on 3 February 1875, the line was officially opened on 24 May 1875. After the railway from Krima-Neudorf to Reitzenhain was opened by Buschtěhrader Eisenbahn on 23 August 1875, the connection to Komotau was completed.

Because of financial losses after one year of operation, Chemnitz-Komotauer Eisenbahngesellschaft had to sell the line to the Saxon state, in whose property it was transferred on 4 December 1876. The line was now owned and operated by the Royal Saxon State Railways

=== Extensions ===
The branch from Olbernhau to Neuhausen opened on 1 October 1895, its bridges were also prepared for a double-tracked line.

The branch to Deutschneudorf (Schweinitz Valley Railway) was opened on 3 May 1927. Passenger traffic ceased there on 21 May 1966, freight traffic on 29 September 1969, and an order for the branch to be lifted was given on 12 June 1970. Soon after, tracks and steel bridges were removed.

A narrow gauge branch from Hetzdorf station to Eppendorf was opened in 1983. It was extended to Großwaltersdorf in 1916. The section Hetzdorf-Eppendorf was lifted in 1951, passenger traffic ceased in 1967, freight traffic in 1968.

=== After World War II ===
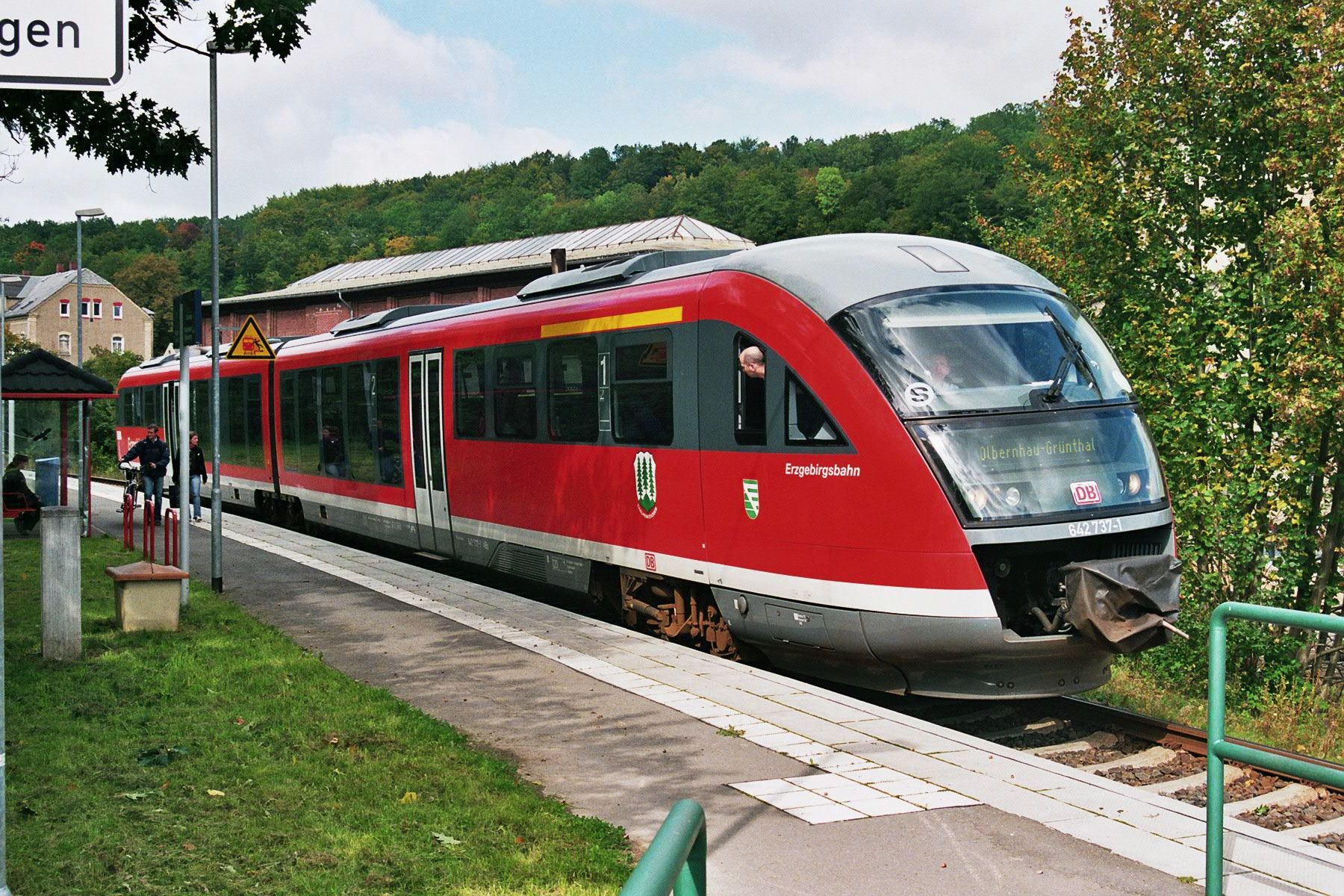
Railcar on the Flöha Valley Railway in Falkenau

Traffic across the border to Komotau was stopped with the end of World War II, so that Reitzenhain station lost much of its importance. After the railway bridge across the border stream was replaced by a road bridge in the 1970, resumption of the cross-border services became unlikely.

A military train coming from Reitzenhain suffered an accident on 30 May 1945 in Hüttengrund, a valley east of Marienberg. The train left Reitzenhain around 22:00 and was hauled by a Class 52 steam locomotive. It transported a tank unit of Red Army. Because of a too high load, the train crew and the station crew initially refused to let the train depart and requested a second locomotive for braking purposes. The Soviet commander, however, threatened the railway personnel and forced the departure. A safety stop in Gelobtland was intended, but proved impossible due to insufficient braking power. Instead, the speed of the train increased in the following steep section. One tank wedged in a cutting in Hüttengrund, after centrifugal forces had made its turret turn, and its gun had touched the rocky wall. Five flatcars detached from the train, and the load of all following cars was thrown off. The remainder of the train could only be stopped in Pockau. The number of victims is not exactly known; one source states 18 dead. The train crew, the Reitzenhain station master and another Reichsbahn official were made responsible for the accident and were detained. The station master was summarily shot one month later. Of the remaining prisoners, only the locomotive fireman survived.

Passenger traffic between Marienberg and Reitzenhain stopped on 1 October 1978, freight traffic on 8 January 1994. This section was closed down on 15 December 1998. Freight traffice between Olbernhau and Neuhausen ceased on 1 January 1994. Passenger traffic on this section was maintained until 9 June 2001, then it was closed due to the poor state of the tracks.

=== Reconstruction and rehabilitation of the line ===
In the mid-1990s Deutsche Bahn AG started to renew the line. To this end, rail traffic between Pockau-Lengefeld and Marienberg was stopped beginning on 23 July 1998. Work on this section had nearly finished at an expense of nearly 24 million Euro, when flooding in July 1999 destroyed much of the line. It took until spring 2002 to decide to rebuild the section. Further delays were caused by destructions on the line between Olbernhau and Flöha by severe flooding in August 2002.

Regular traffic was resumed between Chemnitz and Olbernhau on 29 January 2005, and between Olbernhau and Olbernhau-Grünthal on 29 October 2005. Hourly trains on workdays started to run in this section on 10 December 2006.

Traffic resumed on the Marienberg branch on 4 September 2006. Initially four trains ran each way on workdays, ordered by the district Mittlerer Erzgebirgskreis. Due to the timetable being optimised for school traffic, and unfavourable timetabling of the Chemnitz-Olbernhau trains, connections in Pockau-Lengefeld were poor. A timetable with better connections was introduced on 10 December 2006. More changes were made to the timetable in September 2007 with only one train each way on school days, but four trains each way on weekends and public holidays. From 11 December 2011 there was only one train each way on work days between Marienberg and Pockau-Lengefeld, and the weekend trains were replaced by buses on demand. Passenger traffic between Marienberg and Pockau-Lengefeld ceased on 15 December 2013.

A new halt at Strobel-Mühle was built and opened in 2006. In 2007, a new halt in Olbernhau West was built. In September 2007, basic maintenance was performed the section between Olbernhau-Grünthal and Neuhausen which was threatened by closure, and in 2010 it was rehabilitated for traffic. Regular traffic has not been resumed on this part of the line, since no passenger train runs have been ordered by the regional authorities. Only special trains have run to Neuhausen since 2010.

From 2007 on, freight trains for Bundeswehr have run again to Marienberg.

DB RegioNetz Infrastruktur GmbH announced in early 2014 that they would consider offers of third parties to take over the branch Marienberg – Pockau-Lengefeld and its operation. The same applies to the section Olbernhau-Grünthal - Neuhausen.

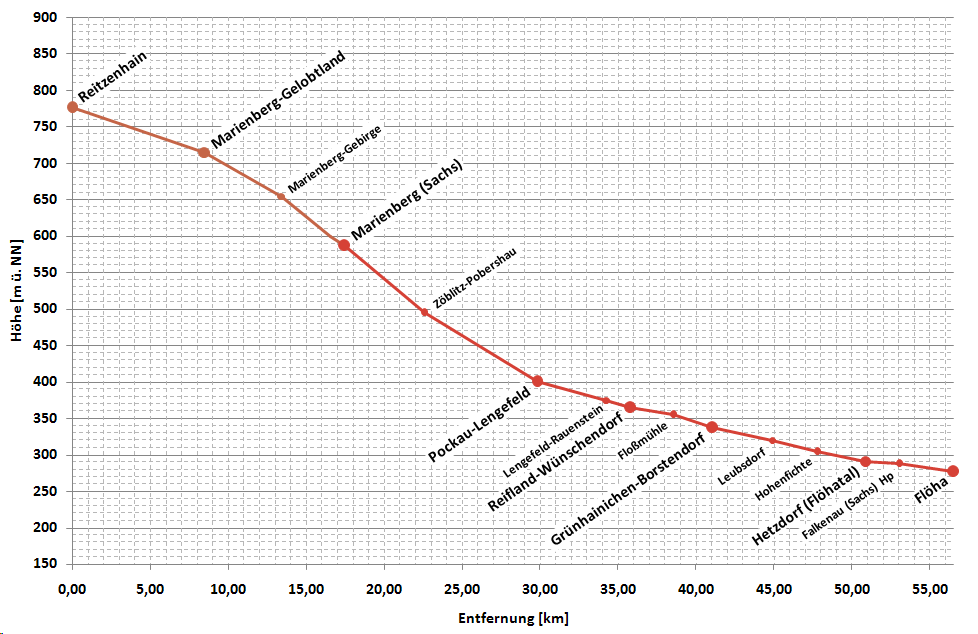
Simplified profile of the Reitzenhain-Flöha line

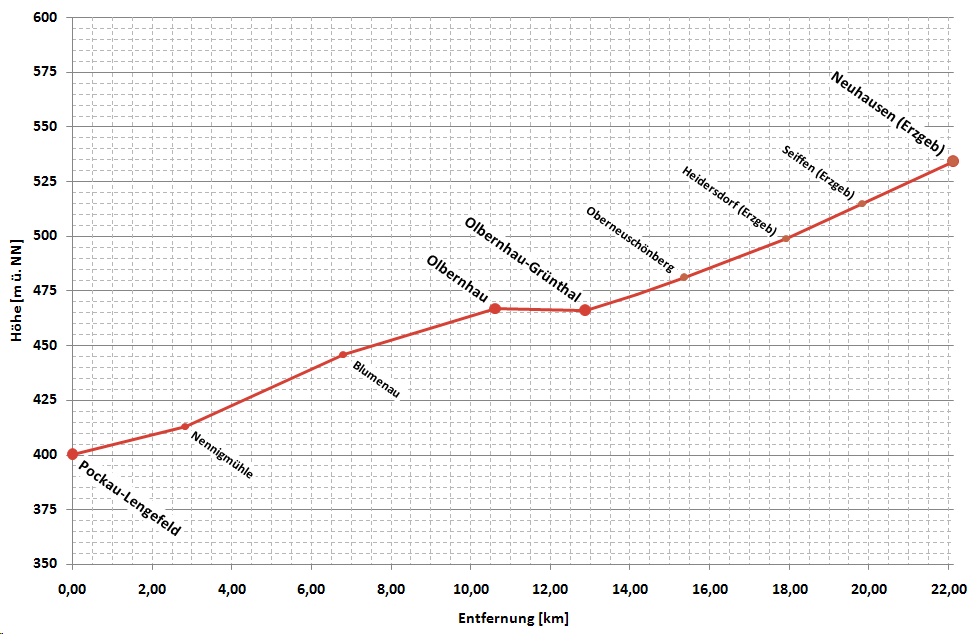
Simplified profile of the Pockau-Lengefeld-Neuhausen branch

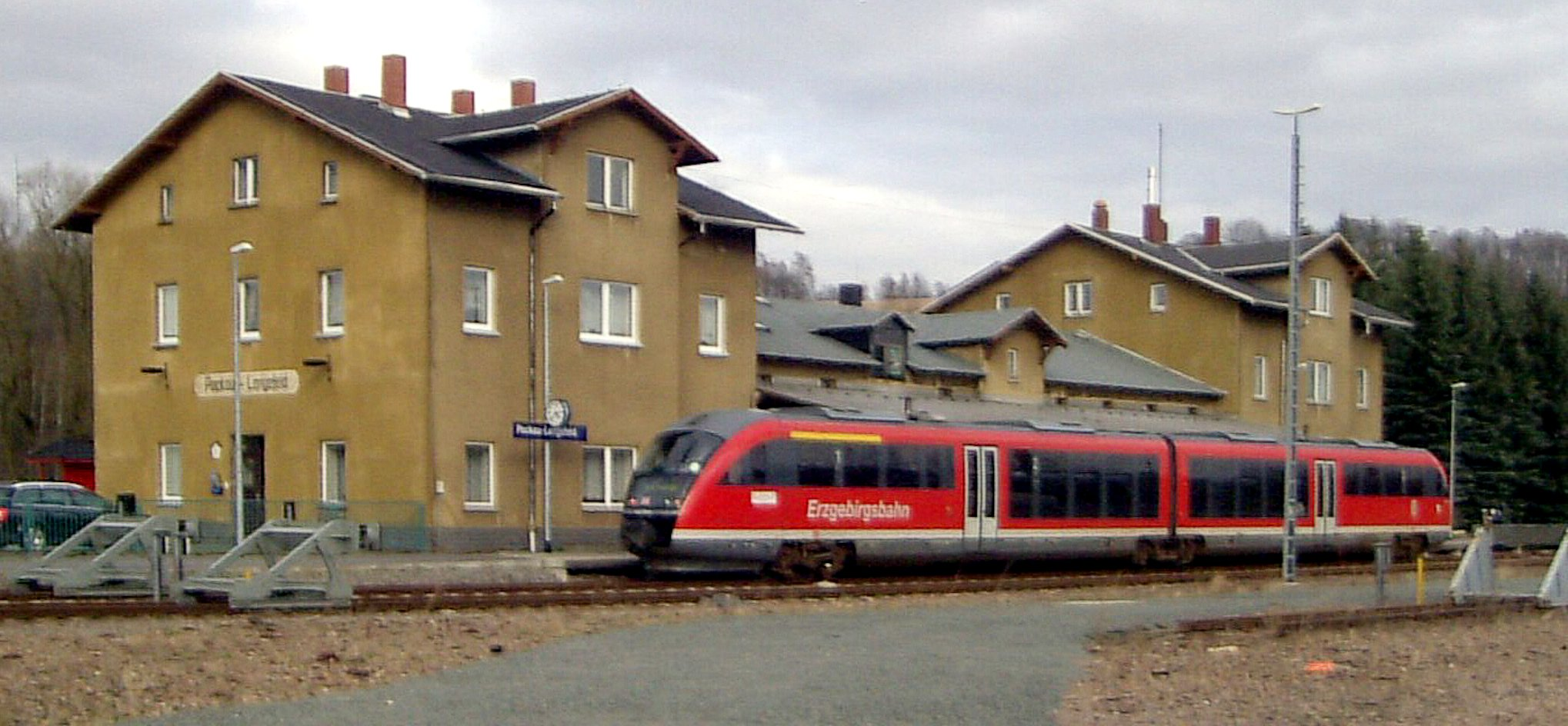
Pockau-Lengefeld station (2009)

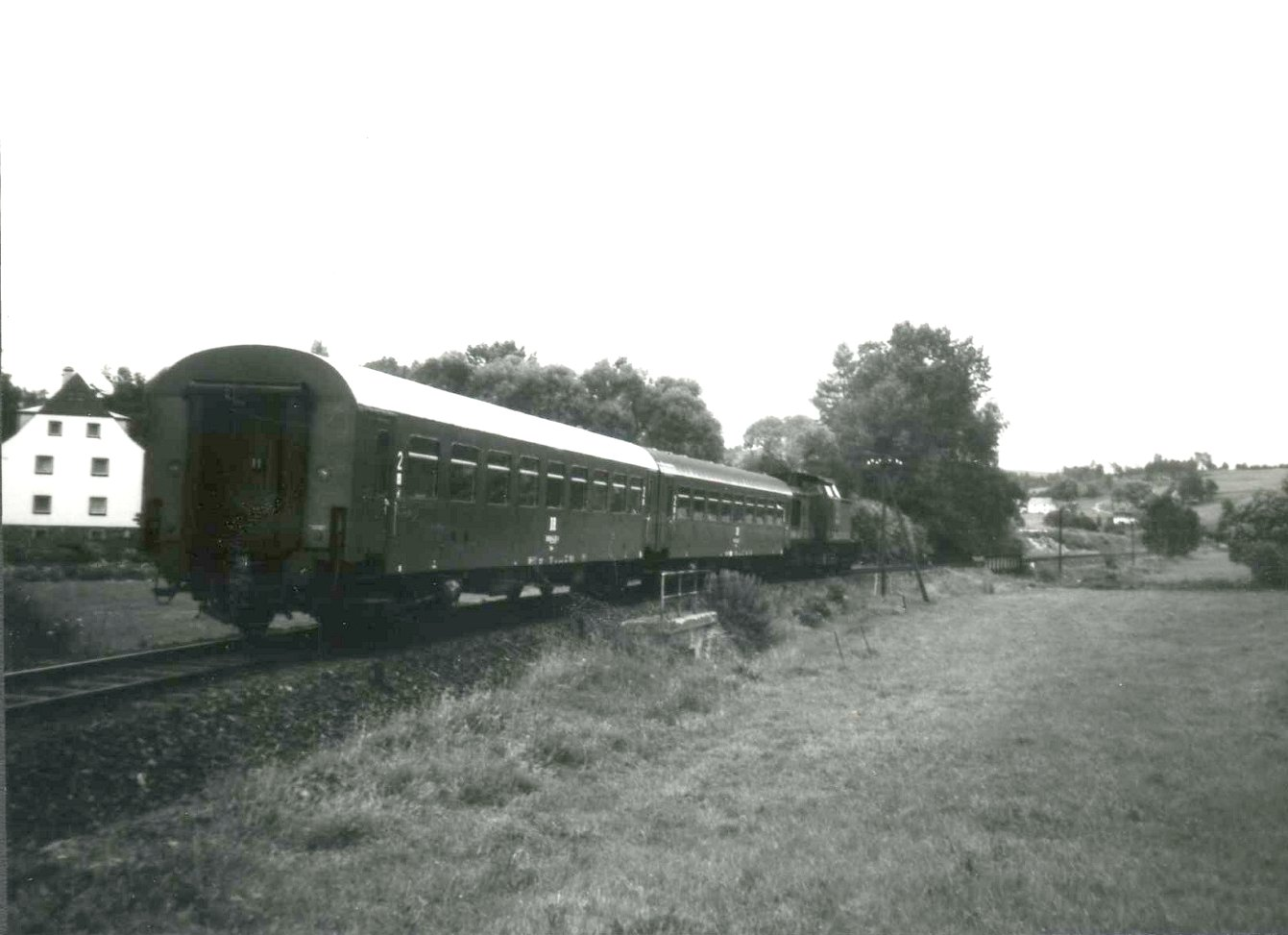
Passenger train in Neuhausen, 1992

== Sources ==
- Günter Baldauf (2001), Die Flöhatalbahn (in German), Friedrichsthal: Altis-Verlag, ISBN 3-910195-30-X
- Reiner Bretfeld (1975), 100 Jahre Flöhatalbahn (in German), Marienberg: DMV AG 3/42
- Dittrich Marz: 130 Jahre Flöhatalbahn, Lengefelder Nachrichten 2005-2006, 12 part series
- Stephan Häupel (2008), Die Eisenbahn im Flöhatal und ihre regelspurigen Zweigstrecken (in German) (1st ed.), Witzschdorf: Fileverlag Böttger, ISBN 978-3-937496-08-5
