= Flöha =

- Town
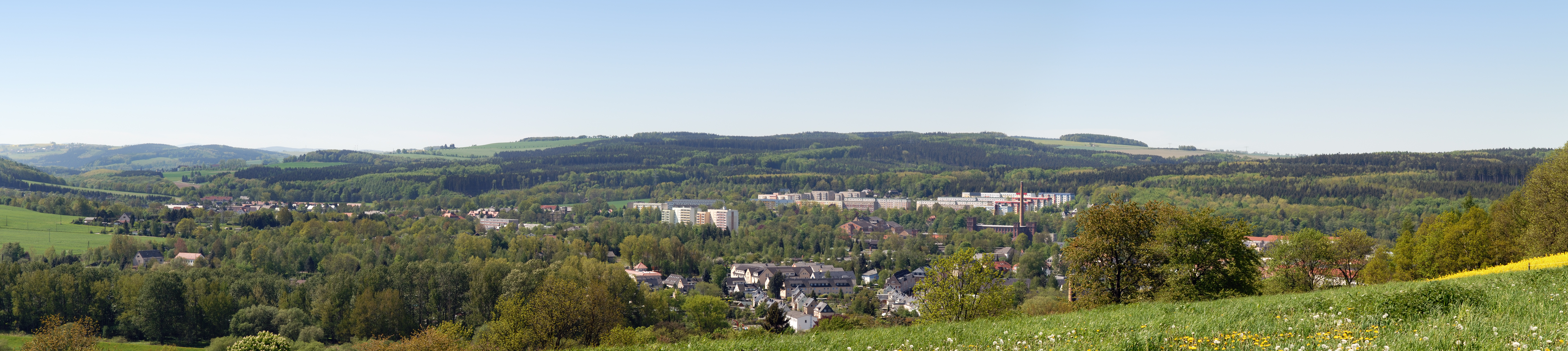
- Flöha

- Coat of arms

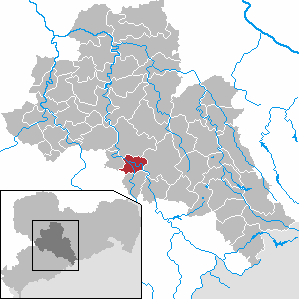
- Location of Flöha within Mittelsachsen district
- Interactive map of Flöha
- Location within Germany Location within Saxony
- Coordinates: 50°51′21″N 13°4′17″E
- Country: Germany
- State: Saxony
- District: Mittelsachsen

Government
  - Mayor (2022–29): Volker Holuscha (Left)

Area
  - Total: 27.76 km^{2} (10.72 sq mi)
- Elevation: 275 m (902 ft)

Population (2025-12-31)
  - Total: 10,218
  - Density: 368.1/km^{2} (953.3/sq mi)
- Time zone: UTC+01:00 (CET)
  - Summer (DST): UTC+02:00 (CEST)
- Postal codes: 09557
- Dialling codes: 03726
- Vehicle registration: FG, BED, DL, FLÖ, HC, MW, RL
- Website: www.floeha.de

Flöha (German pronunciation: [ˈfløːa]) is a town in the district of Mittelsachsen, in Saxony, Germany. Flöha is situated on the confluence of the rivers Zschopau and Flöha, 10 km (6.21 mi) east of Chemnitz.

Flöha station connects the town to Dresden, Chemnitz, Freiberg, Annaberg-Buchholz and other places.

== History ==
During World War II, a subcamp of Flossenbürg concentration camp was located in Flöha. Flöha absorbed the former municipality Falkenau in 2011.

== Sons and daughters of the city ==
- Lothar Kreyssig (1898–1986), founder of the Aktion Sühnezeichen, was born in Flöha
- Anita Nüßner (1935–2025), canoeist (born in Plaue)
- Stefan Schmidt (born 1989), football goalkeeper
- Dieter Wiedemann (born 1941), cyclist, rode the 1967 Tour de France

== Personalities who have worked in the city ==
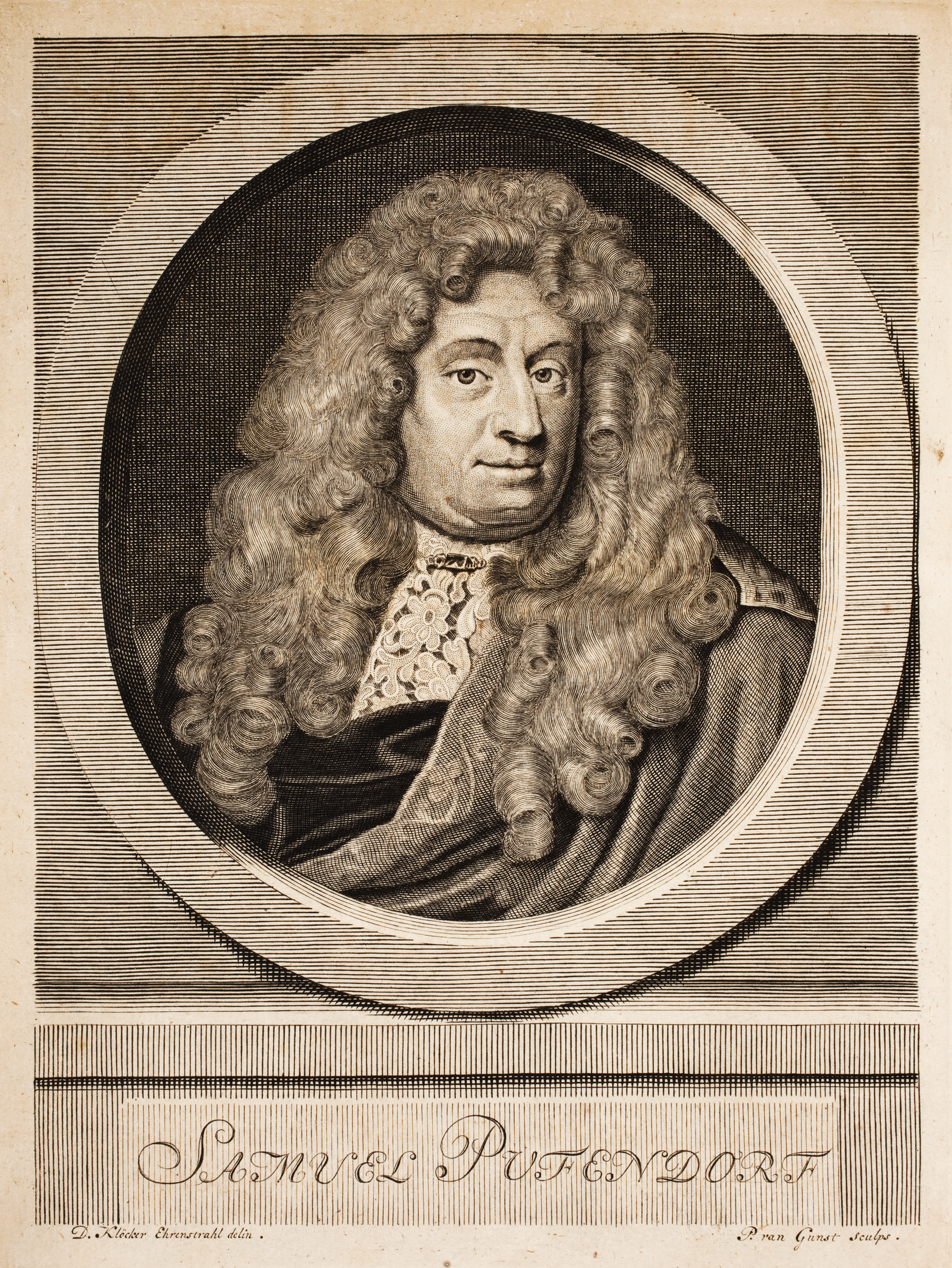
Samuel-von-Pufendorf

- Samuel von Pufendorf (1632–1694), natural law philosopher, historian and natural and international law teacher,
- Herbert Jobst (1915–1990), writer
- Marcus Popp (born 1981), volleyball player
