= Fichtelberg railway =

Narrow gauge railway in Saxony, Germany

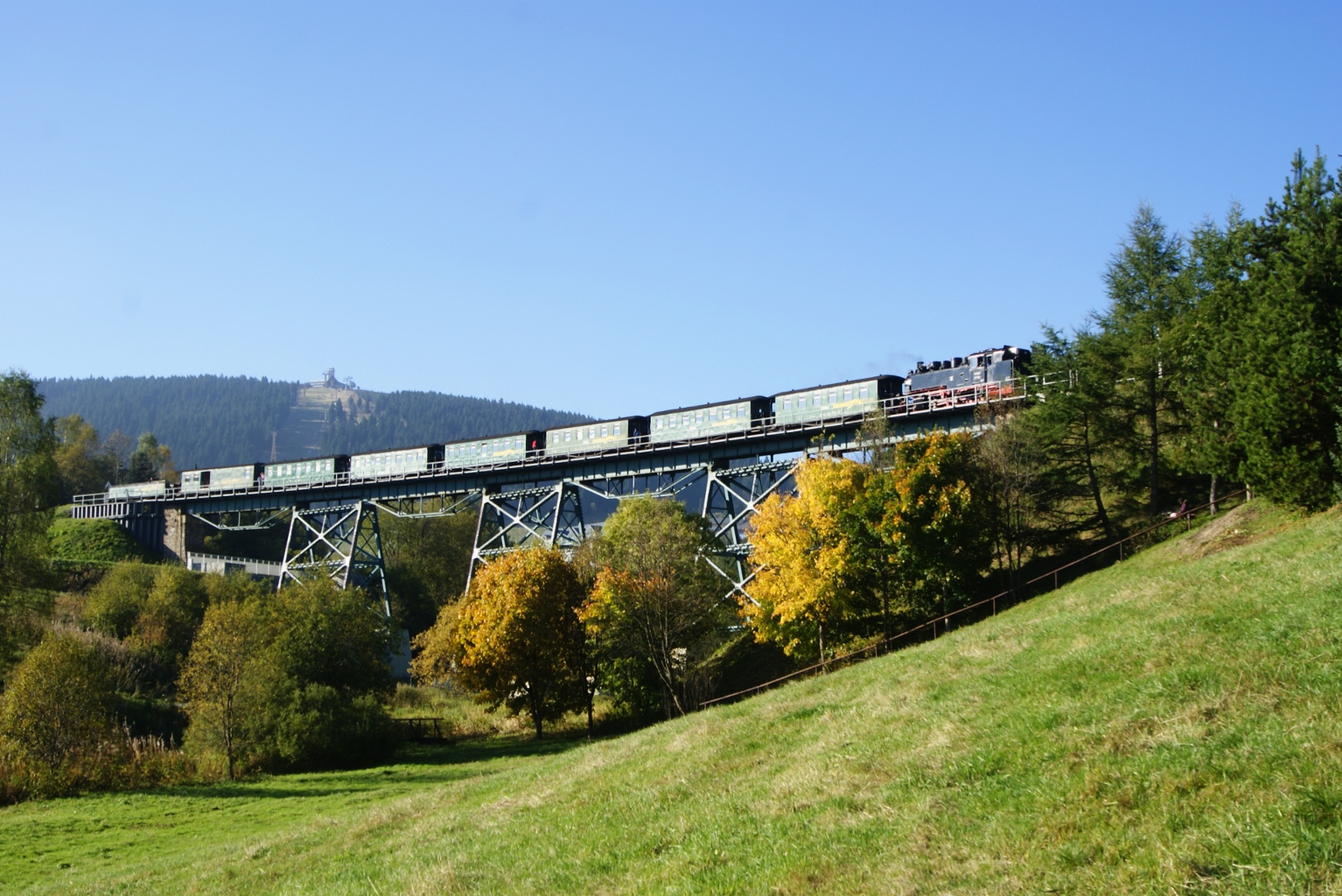
- Hüttenbachtal viaduct by Oberwiesenthal

Overview
- Line number: 6964
- Termini: Cranzahl; Oberwiesenthal

Service
- Type: Narrow gauge railway
- Route number: 518
- Operator(s): Royal Saxon State Railways, Deutsche Reichsbahn, DR, Deutsche Bahn, Saxon Steam Railway Company
- Depot: Cranzahl

History
- Opened: July 20, 1897

Technical
- Line length: 17.349 km (10.78 mi)
- Track gauge: 750 mm (2 ft 5 1/2 in)
- Minimum radius: 100 m (328.1 ft)
- Operating speed: 30 km/h (19 mph)
- Maximum incline: 34‰ or 3.4 %
Route map
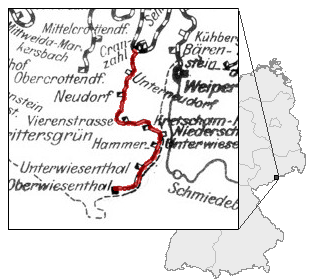

The Fichtelberg railway (German: Fichtelbergbahn) is a 750 mm (2 ft 5 1/2 in) narrow-gauge railway that leads from the standard-gauge international line at Cranzahl to the ski resort of Oberwiesenthal in the Ore Mountains in eastern Germany. It takes its name from the Fichtelberg Mountain near Oberwiesenthal.

== History ==
After the railway from Chemnitz to Chomutov via Annaberg and Vejprty was opened in 1872 (consisting of Chemnitz–Flöha, Flöha–Annaberg, Annaberg–Vejprty and Vejprty–Chomutov sections), plans were made to also connect the former mining town of Oberwiesenthal to the Saxon Railway system. The requirements and qualifications to build a narrow gauge railway from Cranzahl were met by 1884, but it wasn't until 6 April 1896, that construction started. The railway opening took place on 20 July 1897. By the end of that year, 67,756 passengers (and 57 dogs) had already traveled on the new railway.

Passenger count increased in the following years, and tourism played an increasing role in the passenger count. Freight traffic also increased significantly. Until 1906, freight had to be transloaded in Cranzahl; since then transporter wagons made the extra cargo handling unnecessary. The biggest cargo customer – even until the mid-1990s – was the quarry in Hammerunterwiesenthal, requiring around 30 freight cars daily.

In 1990 the railway lost its status as the most important carrier into Oberwiesenthal (which is the highest town in (Germany)), and in 1992 freight service was terminated. In 1994 the Deutsche Bahn became the new owner, and planned to either dismantle the railway, or sell it.

For the 100-year anniversary, the communities along the track, together with the operators of the Pressnitz Valley Railway and the Lößnitzgrund Railway organized a festival week that drew 40,000 visitors. With different rolling stock of narrow gauge railways from all over Germany; a train schedule of extra and regularly scheduled trains meant that there was a train on the track almost every hour. Fun fairs along the track and historic trains ensured the success of the event.

New thinking started after the success of the event, and the district of Annaberg prepared to acquire the railway. On June 1, 1998, the operator BVO Bahn GmbH, since 2007 Saxon Steam Railway Company took over operations from the Deutsche Bahn, and renamed the railway to the catchier Fichtelbergbahn. The new operator aligned operations with the tourism in the surrounding area, and within relative short time achieved country-wide recognition. Especially during the winter months the railway now has similar significance as in its heyday, as winter sports tourists in the towns of Neudorf and Cranzahl can reach the ski areas of Oberwiesenthal with ease and in style.

== Route ==
The railway starts at the standard gauge station Cranzahl at 653 m (2,142.4 ft) of the Vejprty–Annaberg-Buchholz railway. The passenger trains start on the same platform as the standard gauge trains. The former freight yard and its loading ramp for the transporter flatcars is on the northern end of the station. The narrow gauge trains leave the station in a left turn and follow the right side of the Sehma valley through the village of Neudorf.

The first stop is Unterneudorf, followed by Neudorf. The following stop Vierenstrasse is a popular starting point for hiking into the Fichtelberg area. Leaving Vierenstrasse, the track follows a long incline (1:29 or 3.4%) through the densely covered Fichtelberg forest. The next station Kretscham-Rothensehma is used to allow valley-bound trains to pass. The track continues to climb, reaching the watershed of the Pöhlbach river, arriving at the next stop of Niederschlag.

The tracks now lead downward into the Pöhlbach valley, crossing the Bundesstrasse 95, and run along the border with the Czech Republic uphill to the Hammerunterwiesenthal station. Leaving Hammerunterwiesenthal, the valley becomes so narrow that there is only room for the state road and the railroad tracks, steep meadows on the right hand side, and a steep forest to the left on the Czech side of the border.

After the next stop Unterwiesenthal, the track unwinds itself from the narrow valley, and the peaks of Fichtelberg on the right, and Klínovec on the left become visible. After crossing the federal route again, the railway leads over a 110 m (360.9 ft) long and 23 m (75.5 ft) high steel viaduct, and reaches the terminus of Oberwiesenthal at 893 m (2,930 ft).

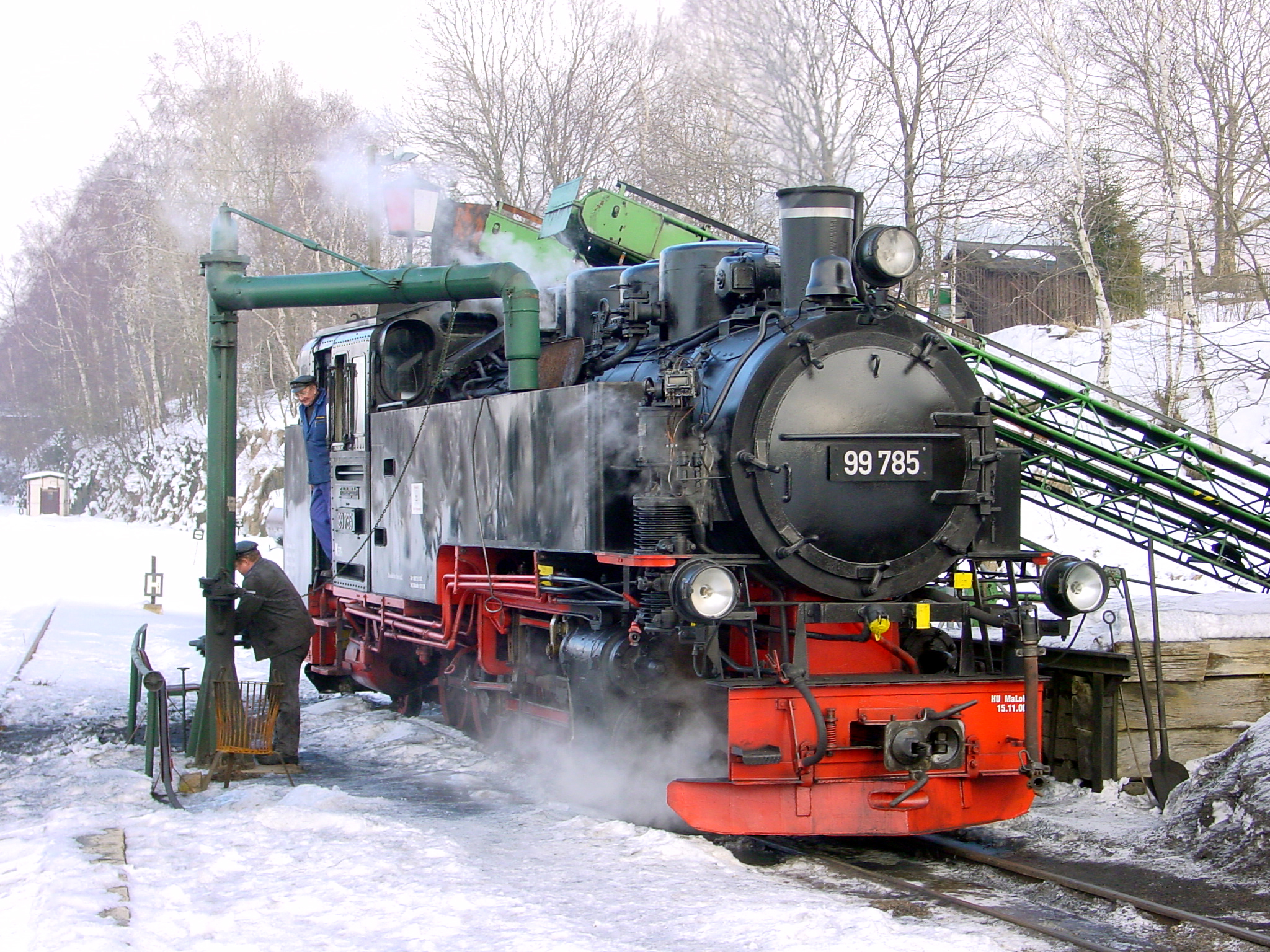
Steam engine 99 785 at the water crane in the Cranzahl station

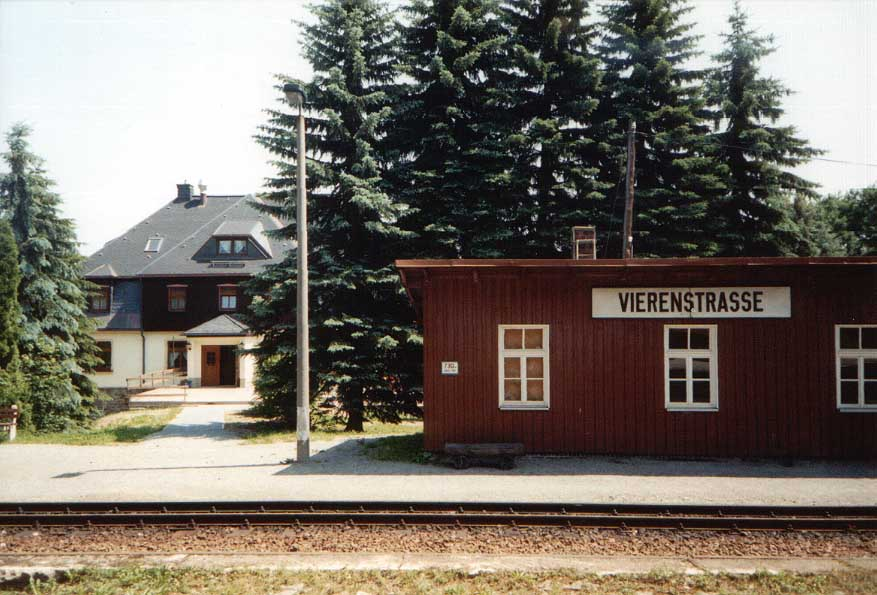
Vierenstrasse stop near Neudorf

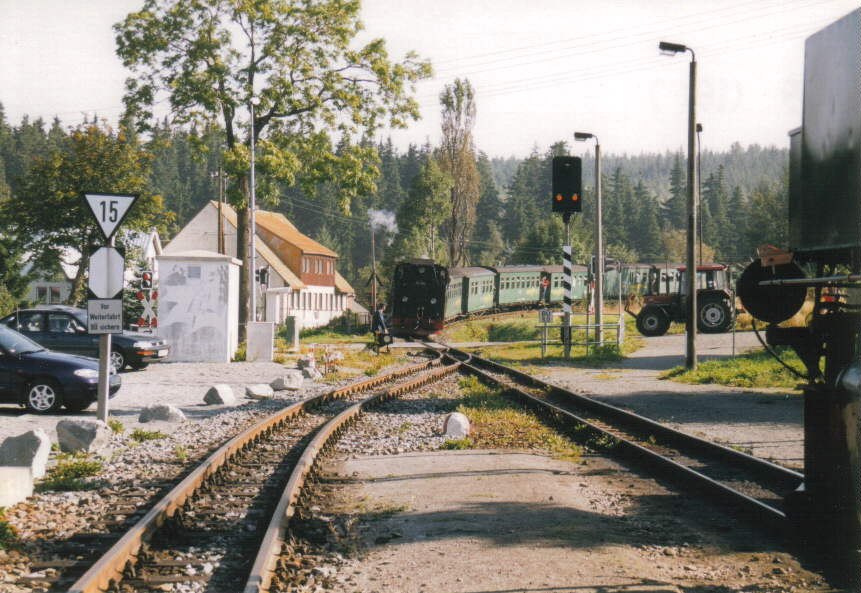
Valley-bound train approaching Kretscham-Rothensehma

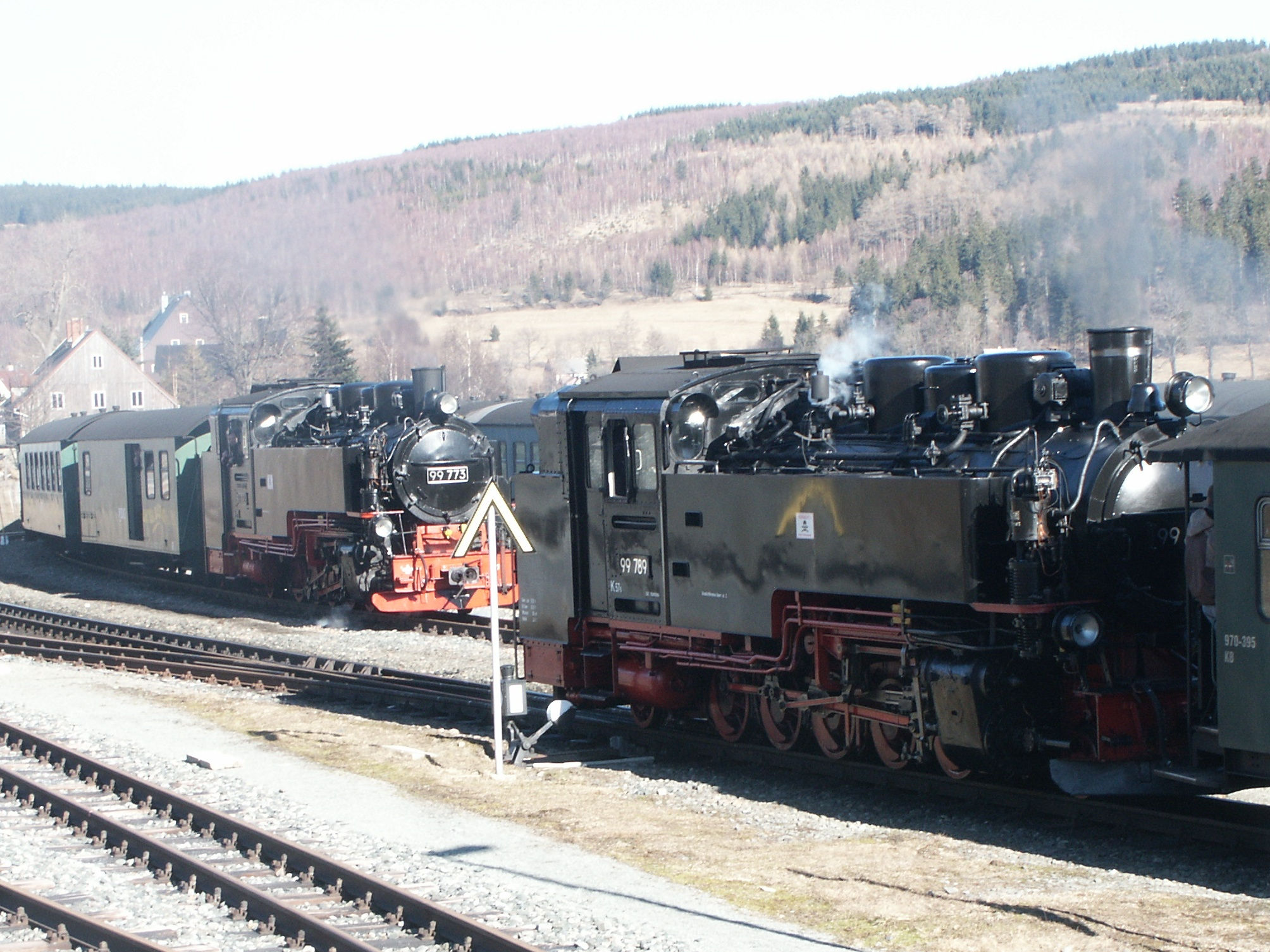
Trains passing in Hammerunterwiesenthal

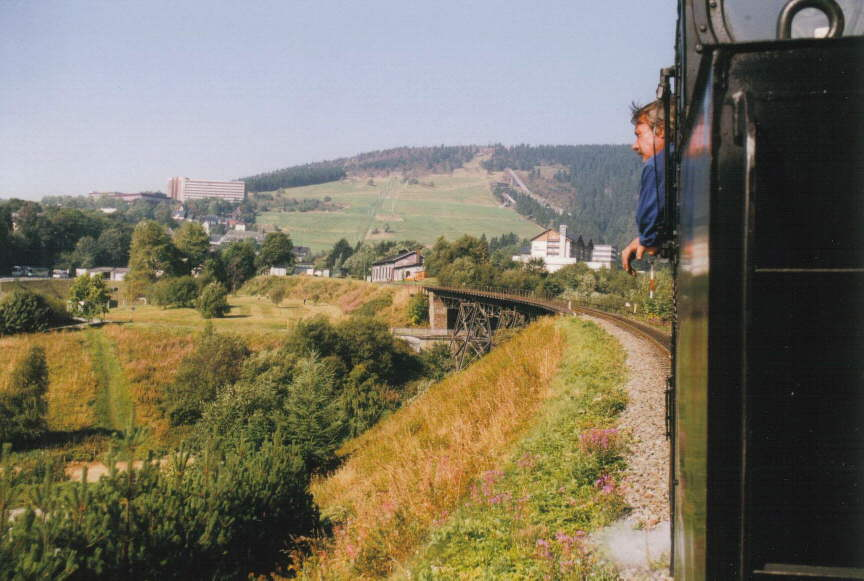
Shortly before reaching Oberwiesenthal

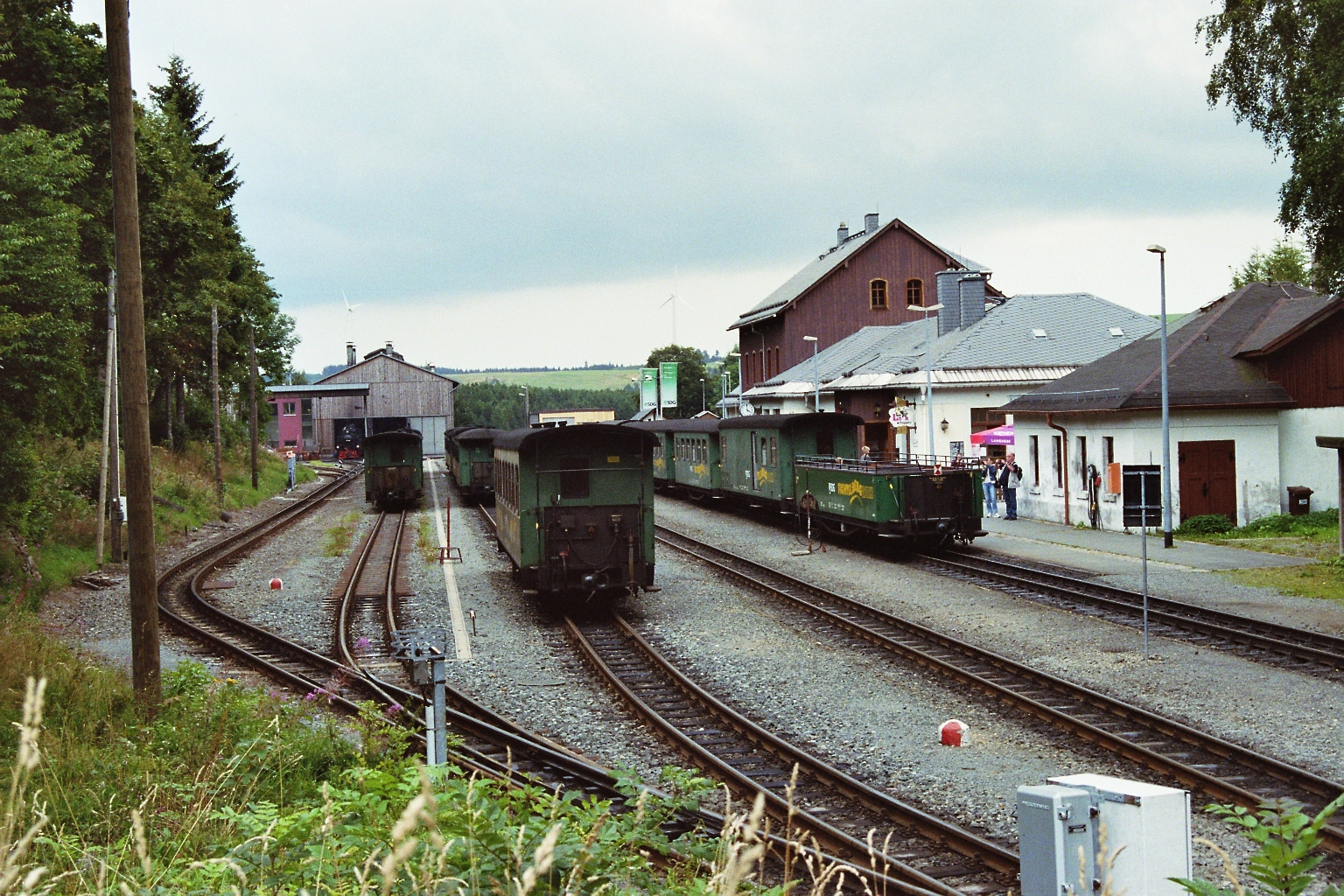
Oberwiesenthal station

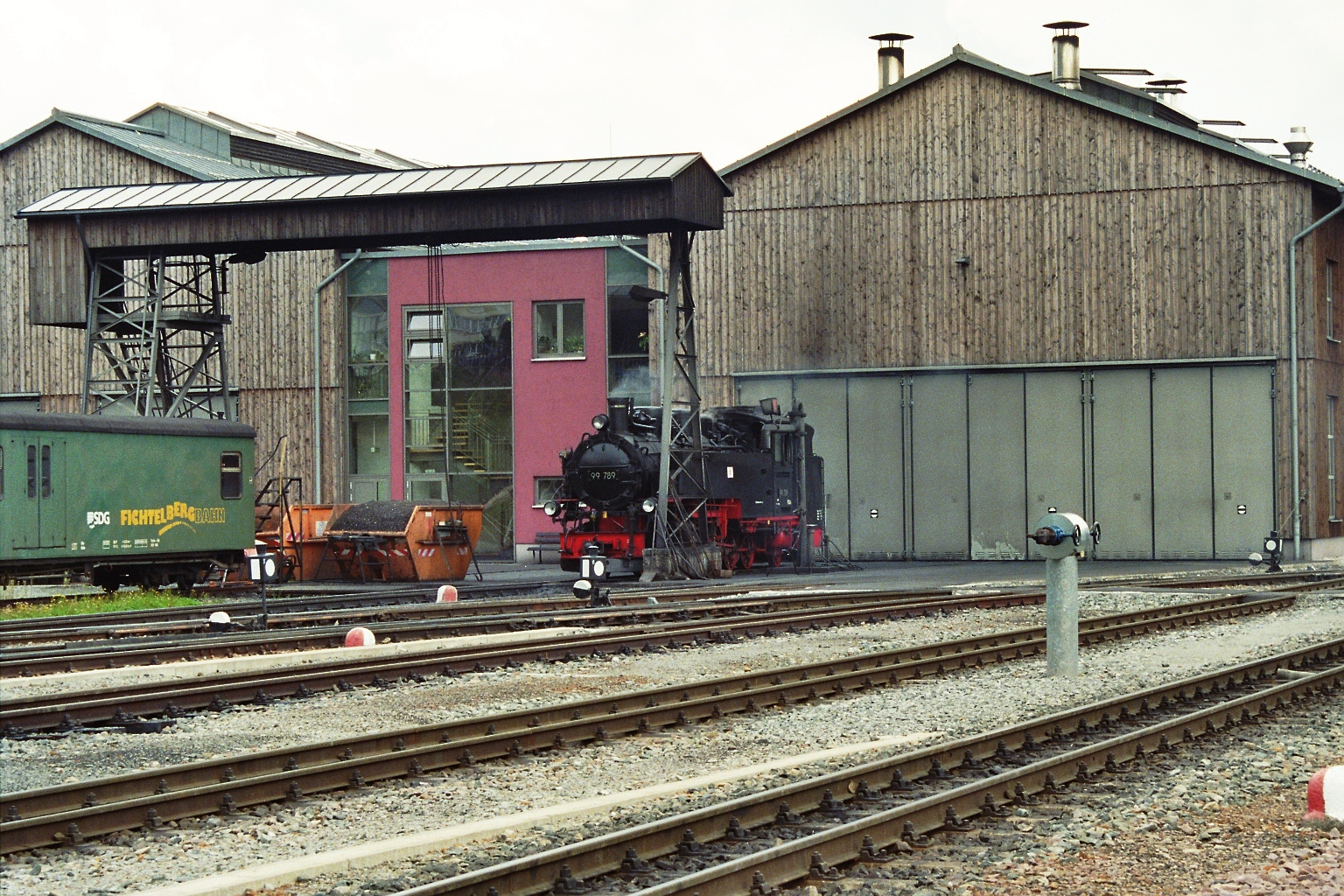
Engine shed in Oberwiesenthal

=== Train operations ===
The SDG operates only steam powered passenger trains, which carry dining and baggage cars. Six train-pairs operate daily. On weekends, trains pass each other in the morning in Neudorf, otherwise trains pass in Hammerunterwiesenthal. The SDG uses steam engines of the DR Class 99.77-79, serial 099 772, 099 773, 099 785, 099 786 and 099 794.

=== Photo opportunities ===
There are many nice photo opportunities along the railway. Notable are the trains passing each other in Neudorf, the valley-bound train entering the Kretscham-Rothensehma station, the train making its way through Hammerunterwiesenthal with the church as backdrop, the ride through the Pöhlbach valley, and the train on the viaduct shortly before entering Oberwiesenthal.

The scenery is enhanced in the winter, when low temperatures increase the volume of steam from the locomotive, and snow-covered forests alternate with small Ore Mountains villages displaying their typical Christmas decoration.

== See also ==
- Narrow gauge railways in Saxony
