= Sehmatal =

- Municipality
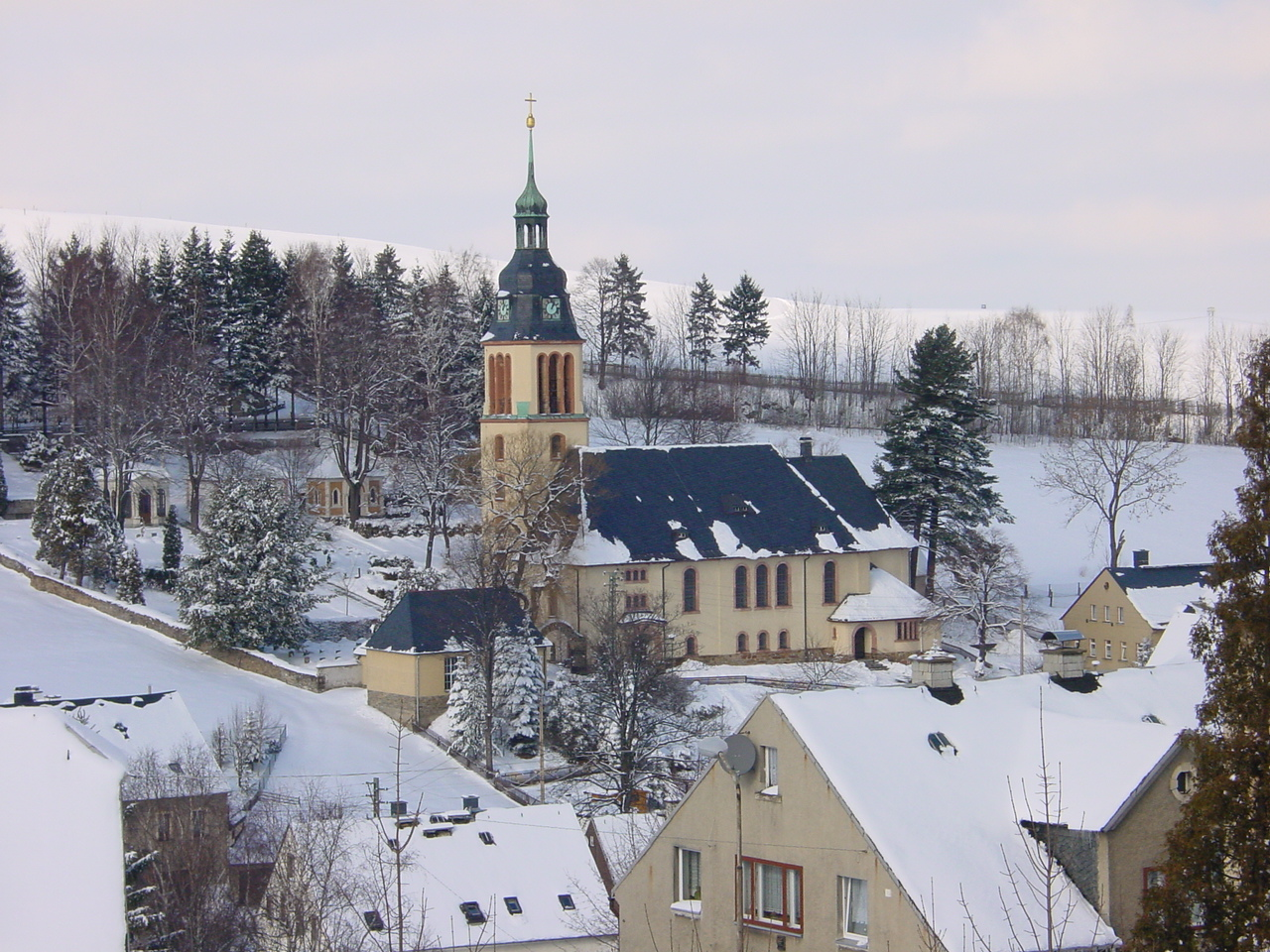
- the church in Cranzahl

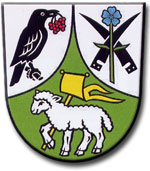
- Coat of arms

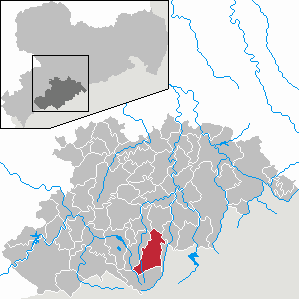
- Location of Sehmatal within Erzgebirgskreis district
- Interactive map of Sehmatal
- Location within Germany Location within Saxony
- Coordinates: 50°31′N 12°59′E
- Country: Germany
- State: Saxony
- District: Erzgebirgskreis
- Subdivisions: 3

Government
  - Mayor (2020–27): Sebastian Nestler

Area
  - Total: 44.45 km^{2} (17.16 sq mi)
- Elevation: 700–800 m (2,300–2,600 ft)

Population (2025-12-31)
  - Total: 5,876
  - Density: 132.2/km^{2} (342.4/sq mi)
- Time zone: UTC+01:00 (CET)
  - Summer (DST): UTC+02:00 (CEST)
- Postal codes: 09465
- Dialling codes: 037342
- Vehicle registration: ERZ, ANA, ASZ, AU, MAB, MEK, STL, SZB, ZP
- Website: www.sehmatal.de

Sehmatal is a municipality in the district of Erzgebirgskreis, in Saxony, Germany, which was created in 1999 through the union of Neudorf, Cranzahl and Sehma. The three villages are located along the Sehma river, aligned in a north-south direction. At the northern end is the former village of Sehma, in the middle the town of Cranzahl, to the south the village of Neudorf.

The town borders to Annaberg-Buchholz in the north, in the east is Königswalde and Bärenstein, Oberwiesenthal is south and Crottendorf in the west. Nearby is the Bärenstein mountain with a height of 898 meters. The trains along Vejprty–Annaberg-Buchholz railway stop in Sehma and Cranzahl. The station in Cranzahl is also the starting point for the Fichtelberg Railway to Oberwiesenthal.

Neudorf is the home town of Olympic gold medalist Viola Bauer.

Sehmatal's sister city in the United States is Running Springs, California.

== History ==
From 1952 to 1990, the constituent localities of Sehmatal (Neudorf, Cranzahl and Sehma) were part of the Bezirk Karl-Marx-Stadt of East Germany.
