= Karl Gratz =

German World War II fighter pilot

- Gratz during World War II
- Born: 24 January 1919; Wiener Neustadt
- Died: 14 March 2002 (aged 83); Leck
- Military career
- Allegiance: Nazi Germany (to 1945); West Germany
- Branch: Luftwaffe; German Air Force
- Service years: 1936–1945, –1970
- Rank: Leutnant (Wehrmacht); Oberstleutnant (Bundeswehr)
- Units: JG 52; JaBoG 33
- Conflicts: World War II; Eastern Front; Second Battle of Kharkov; Western Front
- Awards: Knight's Cross of the Iron Cross

Karl Gratz (24 January 1919 – 14 March 2002) was an Austrian-born Luftwaffe fighter pilot during World War II. As a fighter ace, he was credited with 138 aerial victories claimed in more than 900 missions. Gratz claimed the majority of his victories over the Eastern Front, and 17 over the Western Front.

In late 1941, Gratz was posted to Jagdgeschwader 52 (JG 52—8th squadron of the 52nd Fighter Wing) which at the time was fighting on the Eastern Front. He claimed his first aerial victory on 15 February 1942. On 1 July 1942, he was awarded the Knight's Cross of the Iron Cross following his 54th aerial victory. He then served as a fighter pilot instructor and was posted to Jagdgeschwader 2 "Richthofen" (JG 2—2nd Fighter Wing) in March 1943. Back on the Easter Front in 1944, he claimed his 100th aerial victory in March/April 1944. At the end of World War II, he served as Staffelkapitän (squadron leader) of 10. Staffel (10th squadron) of JG 52. He surrendered to United States Army forces and was turned over to the Red Army.

Gratz was released from captivity in 1949, joined the Bundeswehr and served in Jagdbombergeschwader 33 (JaBoG 33—Fighter-Bomber Wing 33). He retired in 1970 holding the rank of Oberstleutnant (lieutenant colonel). Gratz died on 14 March 2002 in Leck.

== World War II ==
"Charlie" Gratz was posted in autumn 1941 to 8. Staffel (8th squadron) of Jagdgeschwader 52 (JG 52—8th squadron of the 52nd Fighter Wing), a squadron of III. Gruppe (3rd group), on the Eastern Front. (Note: For an explanation of the meaning of Luftwaffe unit designation see Luftwaffe Organization) In January 1942, III. Gruppe was ordered to move from Taganrog to an airfield at Kharkov and was subordinated to IV. Fliegerkorps. At the time, the Gruppe was the only fighter unit operating on the left flank of Army Group South, covering the airspace from Belgorod in the north to the Donets Basin in the south, and was equipped with Messerschmitt Bf 109 F-4. On 18 January, Soviet forces launched the Barvenkovo–Lozovaya Offensive which created the Izium salient. On 15 February, III. Gruppe flew missions in the vicinity of Belgorod and Prokhorovka, over the front lines of the 6th Army. That day, Gratz claimed his first two aerial victories, a Mikoyan-Gurevich MiG-3 fighter which at the time was referred to as an I-61, and an Ilyushin Il-2 ground-attack aircraft.

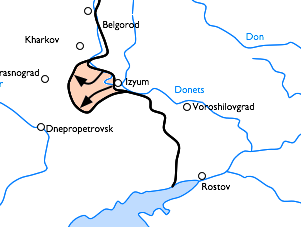
Izium salient (red) in 1942

On 12 May, German forces launched Operation Fredericus, also referred to as the Second Battle of Kharkov, with the objective to eliminate the Izium bridgehead over Seversky Donets. That day, III. Gruppe was moved to the Kharkov-Rogan airfield, southeast of Kharkov, and subordinated to the Stab (headquarters unit) of JG 52. On 13 May, III. Gruppe flew combat missions east and southeast of Kharkov. During the day, the Gruppe claimed 42 aerial victories, including three Mikoyan-Gurevich MiG-1 fighters by Gratz. The following day, III. Gruppe predominantly flew fighter escort missions for Junkers Ju 87 dive bombers from VIII. Fliegerkorps attacking Soviet ground forces on the northern pincer, and claimed 52 aerial victories for the loss of one aircraft damaged. That day, Graz became an "ace-in-a-day" for the first time when he shot down two Lavochkin-Gorbunov-Gudkov LaGG-3 and seven MiG-1 fighters, taking his total to 27 aerial victories. During the following days, III. Gruppe continued to fly missions in support of the Army. Gratz claimed two Polikarpov I-16 fighters on 15 May, a single MiG-1 on 16 May, two further MiG-1s on 17 May, and yet another MiG-1 fighter on 18 May.

On 20 May, III. Gruppe moved to an airfield at Barwenkowa, approximately 40 kilometres (25 miles) south-southwest of Izium. By the end of May 24, Soviet forces opposite Kharkov had been surrounded by German formations, over the next days, Soviet forces attempt to break the encirclement. During this combat, Gratz claimed four aerial victories on 26 May over two LaGG-3s and two MiG-1s. The next day, he added three further aerial victories to his tally, a LaGG-3 and two MiG-1s. On 29 May, his total reached 42 aerial victories when he shot down an I-16 and yet another MiG-1. He received the Honor Goblet of the Luftwaffe (Ehrenpokal der Luftwaffe) on 8 June 1942.

On 26 June, III. Gruppe then moved to Bely Kolodez where they stayed until 3 July. By this date, Gratz had accumulated 54 aerial victories, making him the sixth most successful fighter pilot of III. Gruppe. He received the Knight's Cross of the Iron Cross (Ritterkreuz des Eisernen Kreuzes) on 1 July 1942. The presentation was made by Major Hubertus von Bonin. Gratz was one of four JG 52 pilots presented with the Knight's Cross that day. The other three pilots to receive the distinction that day were Feldwebel Alfred Grislawski, Feldwebel Karl Steffen and Oberleutnant Siegfried Simsch.

=== On the Western Front ===
After a spell instructing, Gratz was posted in March 1943 to 11. Staffel (11th squadron) of Jagdgeschwader 2 "Richthofen" (JG 2—2nd Fighter Wing) on the English channel front. The 11. Staffel was an additional 4th squadron of I. Gruppe of JG 2 which was based at Triquerville and equipped with the Bf 109 G-3. On 1 October 1943, the squadron was renumbered and from then on was known as 4. Staffel of JG 2.

On 12 March, Gratz claimed his first aerial victory on the Western Front when he shot down a Supermarine Spitfire fighter 30 kilometers (19 miles) northwest of Fécamp. The Royal Air Force (RAF) Fighter Command suffered only one casualty in combat that day. A Spitfire IX, BS548, flown by Captain O Massart of No. 340 Squadron was severely damaged in battle with a Fw 190 belonging to JG 2. The pilot returned unhurt. Massart formed part of a Ramrod patrol to Rouen.

On 4 April, he claimed two further Spitfires destroyed in combat 80 kilometers (50 miles) north of Caen. Fighter Command lost ten pilots killed, one captured while two evaded capture with help from the French resistance. JG 26 claimed five, JG 2 claimed six and one fell in combat with JG 1. No. 129 Squadron is known to have engaged JG 2 over the English Channel while on a Roadstead operation. JG 2 claimed two of their number. The only casualty was Flight Sergeant A J Symonds. His body was recovered by a Supermarine Walrus. The following day Gratz claimed a victory near Ostend. Fighter Command carried out two Ramrod operations in the morning and one in the afternoon, losing three fighters in total. Sergeant J S Hetherington of No. 129 Squadron, in Spitfire AR527, was killed in action with JG 2 on a sweep from Venturas to Landunvez. No. 332 Squadron RAF lost Spitfire ES291 and the pilot Sergeant S N Larssen killed on Ramrod 52 to Haamstede. In the afternoon, another Ramrod to Landunvez killed No. 616 Squadron RAF Flight Lieutenant P B Wright DFC in Spitfire BS465.

Gratz received the German Cross in Gold (Deutsches Kreuz in Gold) on 8 June 1943. On 16 August, the Eighth Air Force of the United States Army Air Forces (USAAF) targeted the Le Bourget airfield near Paris with a large formation of Boeing B-17 Flying Fortress escorted by a number of Republic P-47 Thunderbolt escort fighters. In defense of this attack, I. Gruppe of JG 2 claimed three B-17s and one P-47 shot down for the loss of five pilots killed in action. In this encounter, Gratz was credited with the destruction of one B-17 shot down 9 km (5.6 mi) southeast of Brétigny.

=== On the Eastern Front ===
In March 1944, Gratz returned to JG 52. There, he was assigned to 8. Staffel under command of Oberleutnant Friedrich Obleser. The Staffel was subordinated to III. Gruppe led by Major Wilhelm Batz and was based at Cape Chersonesus, located at the Sevastopol Bay, fighting in the Soviet Crimean Offensive. There, Gratz was credited with his 100th aerial victory, making him the sixth most successful fighter pilot of III. Gruppe. He was the 64th Luftwaffe pilot to achieve the century mark. On 1 June, III. Gruppe relocated to Roman in Romania, defending Romanian targets against the USAAF Fifteenth Air Force.

On 1 April 1945, Gratz was appointed Staffelkapitän (squadron leader) of 10. Staffel of JG 52. He succeeded Leutnant Viktor Petermann who was transferred. 10. Staffel was subordinated to III. Gruppe of JG 52 and headed by Major Adolf Borchers. III. Gruppe relocated to Roman on 18 May. After the surrender, Gratz was handed over by U.S. military to the Soviet authorities and remained in captivity until 1949.

== Later life ==
Post-war, his military service in the Bundeswehr saw him promoted to Oberstleutnant. Gratz served in Jagdbombergeschwader 33 (JaBoG 33—Fighter-Bomber Wing 33) flying the Republic F-84F Thunderstreak then under the command of Walter Krupinski. JaBoG 33 was transferred to the Turkish base at Bandırma for shooting and bombing training with live ammunition from 25 May to 31 August 1959. During one of the practice flights Gratz was nearly shot down by his wingman Leutnant Dietrich Schultz-Sembten. Schultz-Sembten had mistakenly fired all of his rockets prematurely during the attack run. After the landing, Gratz is quoted with having said: "Schultz-Sembten, you must have gone mad! I have to say one thing, you idiot: If you had hit me, I would have outmaneuvered you and shot you down." Following his retirement in March 1970, Gratz died on 14 March 2002 at the age of 83 in Leck, Germany.

== Summary of career ==
=== Aerial victory claims ===
According to US historian David T. Zabecki, Gratz was credited with 138 aerial victories. Obermaier and Spick also list Gratz with 138 aerial victories, including 17 on the Western Front of which three of them were USAAF four-engined bombers. Barbas states that Gratz claimed 18 aerial victories after 16 February, 14 of which are undocumented. Mathews and Foreman, authors of Luftwaffe Aces — Biographies and Victory Claims, researched the German Federal Archives and state that Gratz was credited with 138 aerial victories. This figure includes 132 aerial victories on the Eastern Front and six over the Western Allies, including one four-engined bomber.

Victory claims were logged to a map-reference (PQ = Planquadrat), for example "PQ 44442". The Luftwaffe grid map (Jägermeldenetz) covered all of Europe, western Russia and North Africa and was composed of rectangles measuring 15 minutes of latitude by 30 minutes of longitude, an area of about 360 square miles (930 km^{2}). These sectors were then subdivided into 36 smaller units to give a location area 3 km × 4 km (1.9 mi × 2.5 mi) in size.

Chronicle of aerial victories
This and the ♠ (Ace of spades) indicates those aerial victories which made Gratz an "ace-in-a-day", a term which designates a fighter pilot who has shot down five or more airplanes in a single day. This and the ? (question mark) indicates information discrepancies listed by Barbas, Prien, Stemmer, Rodeike, Bock, Mathews and Foreman.
Claim	Date	Time	Type	Location	Claim	Date	Time	Type	Location
– 8. Staffel of Jagdgeschwader 52 – Eastern Front — 6 December 1941 – 28 April 1942
1	15 February 1942	13:47	I-61 (MiG-3)		6	9 March 1942	12:37	I-61 (MiG-3)	
2	15 February 1942	15:50	Il-2		7	18 March 1942	12:24	SB-2	
3	16 February 1942	07:35	Il-2		8	24 March 1942	16:53	I-61 (MiG-3)	
4	22 February 1942	15:35	V-11 (Il-2)		9	7 April 1942	13:12	I-61 (MiG-3)	
5	8 March 1942	11:18	I-61 (MiG-3)		10	7 April 1942	13:17	I-61 (MiG-3)	
– 8. Staffel of Jagdgeschwader 52 – Eastern Front — 29 April – October 1942
11	30 April 1942	14:27	I-16		48	22 June 1942	08:28	LaGG-3	
12	30 April 1942	14:32	I-61 (MiG-3)		49	23 June 1942	14:45	MiG-1	
13	30 April 1942	14:36	I-153		50	24 June 1942	05:51	MiG-1	
14	3 May 1942	11:47	I-16		51	24 June 1942	05:54	MiG-1	
15	8 May 1942	15:35	MiG-1		52	24 June 1942	05:58	MiG-1	
16	13 May 1942	06:47	MiG-1		53	30 June 1942	13:28	LaGG-3	
17	13 May 1942	09:09	MiG-1		54	30 June 1942	13:54	Hurricane	
18	13 May 1942	09:12	MiG-1		55	4 September 1942	13:48	MiG 1	PQ 44442, south of Mozdok
19♠	14 May 1942	07:02	LaGG-3		56	4 September 1942	16:53	I-16	PQ 44452 south of Mozdok
20♠	14 May 1942	07:08	LaGG-3		57	7 September 1942	08:45	Pe-2	PQ 44454, south of Mozdok vicinity of Wosnessnokaja
21♠	14 May 1942	09:39	MiG-1		58	8 September 1942	12:44	LaGG-3	PQ 44377, south of Mozdok
22♠	14 May 1942	09:43	MiG-1		59	9 September 1942	14:01	MiG-1	PQ 44442, south of Mozdok
23♠	14 May 1942	12:10	MiG-1		60	9 September 1942	16:46	LaGG-3	PQ 44463 south of Mozdok
24♠	14 May 1942	12:14	MiG-1	5 km (3.1 mi) west of Kotowka	61	17 September 1942	14:30	I-16	PQ 54362 vicinity of Dudorovskiy
25♠	14 May 1942	12:17	MiG-1		62	22 September 1942	08:35	La-5	PQ 44671
26♠	14 May 1942	18:16	MiG-1		63	22 September 1942	08:40	MiG-1	PQ 44572 east of Elkhotovo
27♠	14 May 1942	18:19	MiG-1		64	25 September 1942	16:22? (Note: According to Mathews and Foreman claimed at 16:20 as a Polikarpov I-16.)	Il-2?	PQ 44372 east of Elkhotovo
28	15 May 1942	07:58	I-16		65	27 September 1942	12:35	LaGG-3	PQ 44613
29	15 May 1942	17:02	I-16		66	27 September 1942	14:58	Boston	PQ 4442, south of Mozdok
30	16 May 1942	08:04	MiG-1		67	27 September 1942	15:06	Boston	PQ 44451 west of Werchne Atschakuli
31	17 May 1942	07:02	MiG-1		68	27 September 1942	15:08	LaGG-3	PQ 44483
32	17 May 1942	07:12	MiG-1		69♠	28 September 1942	12:27	LaGG-3	PQ 44674 south of Sagopschin
33	18 May 1942	05:14	MiG-1		70♠	28 September 1942	12:30	LaGG-3	PQ 44642
34	26 May 1942	05:28	LaGG-3		71♠	28 September 1942	12:32	LaGG-3	PQ 44554
35	26 May 1942	09:36	MiG-1	5 km (3.1 mi) northeast of Izium	72♠	28 September 1942	16:03	LaGG-3	PQ 44563
36	26 May 1942	09:40	MiG-1	3 km (1.9 mi) east of Izium	73♠	28 September 1942	16:08	LaGG-3	PQ 44572
37	26 May 1942	17:15	LaGG-3		74	29 September 1942	07:58	LaGG-3	PQ 44614 south of Sagopschin
38	27 May 1942	04:55	MiG-1		75	29 September 1942	08:04	LaGG-3	PQ 44623 vicinity of Malgobek
39	27 May 1942	04:58	MiG-1		76	30 September 1942	16:03	LaGG-3	PQ 44614, south of Sagopschin
40	27 May 1942	18:43	LaGG-3		77	30 September 1942	16:05	LaGG-3	PQ 44644
41	29 May 1942	16:50	I-16		78	30 September 1942	16:09	LaGG-3	PQ 44652
42	29 May 1942	17:18	LaGG-3		79	2 October 1942	13:48	I-16	PQ 43282
43	2 June 1942	14:42	Su-2 (Seversky)		80	2 October 1942	13:52? (Note: According to Mathews and Foreman claimed at 13:53.)	I-16	PQ 34423
44	2 June 1942	14:51	Su-2 (Seversky)		81	4 October 1942	14:58	Boston	PQ 44721 south of Elkhotovo
45	2 June 1942	14:59	MiG-1		82	4 October 1942	15:01	LaGG-3	PQ 44764
46	9 June 1942	19:09	MiG-1		83	4 October 1942	15:07	Boston	PQ 44842
47	21 June 1942	05:19	Il-2						
– 11. Staffel of Jagdgeschwader 2 "Richthofen" – Western Front — 1 January – 31 December 1943
84	12 March 1943	13:05	Spitfire	30 km (19 mi) northwest of Fécamp	87	5 April 1943	16:02	Spitfire	80 km (50 mi) north of Ostend
85	4 April 1943	13:28	Spitfire	80 km (50 mi) north of Caen	88	27 July 1943	18:35	Spitfire	25 km (16 mi) east of Caen
86	4 April 1943	13:32	Spitfire	80 km (50 mi) north of Caen	89	16 August 1943	11:45	B-17	9 km (5.6 mi) southeast of Brétigny
– 8. Staffel of Jagdgeschwader 52 – Eastern Front — 1 January – 31 December 1944
90	19 April 1944	17:20	P-40	PQ 34 Ost 35453 vicinity of Sevastopol; 15 km (9.3 mi) east of Sevastopol	105	24 May 1944	06:34	LaGG	PQ 24 Ost 78712; 25 km (16 mi) northeast of Iași
91	22 April 1944	17:14	P-39	PQ 34 Ost 25469; 25464; 20 km (12 mi) west-northwest of Yelnya	106	30 May 1944	07:14	Pe-2	PQ 24 Ost 78522; 25 km (16 mi) west of Tudora
92	22 April 1944	17:30	Il-2 m.H. (Note: The "m.H." refers to an Ilyushin Il-2 with rear gunner (mit Heckschütze).)	PQ 34 Ost 35482; 15 km (9.3 mi) southeast of Sevastopol	107	30 May 1944	15:50	Il-2 m.H.	PQ 78674; 8 km (5.0 mi) north of Iași
93	23 April 1944	10:10	LaGG	vicinity of Balaklava; 10 km (6.2 mi) south of Sevastopol	108	5 June 1944	10:21	Yak-9	PQ 79561 vicinity of Huși
94	24 April 1944	09:16	LaGG	PQ 35452; 15 km (9.3 mi) east of Sevastopol	109	12 June 1944	17:34	LaGG	PQ 78869; 25 km (16 mi) east of Iași
95	24 April 1944	15:23	Il-2 m.H.	PQ 34 Ost 35482; 15 km (9.3 mi) southeast of Sevastopol	110	22 June 1944	14:08	LaGG	PQ 68872 north of Târgu Frumos
96	24 April 1944	15:36	LaGG	PQ 34 Ost 35454; 15 km (9.3 mi) east of Sevastopol	111	27 June 1944	16:40	P-39? (Note: According to Mathews and Foreman claimed as a Douglas A-20 Havoc.)	PQ 85233 east of Stawropoliskaja
97	24 April 1944	15:36	LaGG	PQ 34 Ost 35454; 15 km (9.3 mi) east of Sevastopol	112	16 July 1944	08:28	P-39	PQ 50328; 20 km (12 mi) north-northeast of Ternopil
98	25 April 1944	07:44	LaGG	vicinity of Katscha	113	16 July 1944	08:31	P-39	PQ 50362; 25 km (16 mi) east-northeast of Ternopil
99	5 May 1944	10:42	P-39	PQ 35433; 25 km (16 mi) east-northeast of Sevastopol	114	16 July 1944	08:48	Pe-2	PQ 50366; 25 km (16 mi) east-northeast of Ternopil
100	6 May 1944	13:02	LaGG	vicinity of Belbek vicinity of Sevastopol	115	20 July 1944	09:31	P-39	PQ 32835 vicinity of Liuboml
101	21 May 1944	05:32	LaGG	PQ 68884; 20 km (12 mi) south-southwest of Târgu Frumos	116	22 August 1944	09:16	P-39	PQ 25 Ost 11415; 15 km (9.3 mi) west of Sandomir
102	21 May 1944	05:38	LaGG	PQ 68853; 10 km (6.2 mi) southwest of Târgu Frumos	117? (Note: According to Barbas, this claim was filed while flying with the Stab of JG 52.)	24 October 1944	15:58	Yak-9	20 km (12 mi) north-northeast of Majdanpek
103	22 May 1944	06:42	LaGG	PQ 78742; 20 km (12 mi) north-northeast of Roman	118	26 October 1944	11:00	Il-2	15 km (9.3 mi) south of Orșova
104	22 May 1944	10:50	P-39	PQ 78342; 30 km (19 mi) east-southeast of Botoșani	119	26 October 1944	11:04	Il-2	15 km (9.3 mi) southeast of Turnu Severin
– 10. Staffel of Jagdgeschwader 52 – Eastern Front — 1 January – April 1945
121	16 February 1945	—	unknown		127	10 April 1945	—	P-39	
123	24 March 1945	—	Yak-9	PQ 71147 vicinity of Strehlen	128	10 April 1945	—	Yak-3	
124	9 April 1945	—	P-39		129	10 April 1945	—	P-39	
125	9 April 1945	—	P-38		131	17 April 1945	—	Yak-9	
126	9 April 1945	—	P-39						

=== Awards ===
- Iron Cross (1939) 2nd and 1st Class
- Honor Goblet of the Luftwaffe on 8 June 1942 as Unteroffizier and pilot
- Knight's Cross of the Iron Cross on 1 July 1942 as Unteroffizier and pilot in the 8./Jagdgeschwader 52
- German Cross in Gold on 8 June 1943 as Feldwebel in the 8./Jagdgeschwader 52 (Note: According to Obermaier on 26 July 1943.)
