= Viktor Petermann =

WWII German military pilot

- Born: 26 May 1916; Weipert
- Died: 19 May 2001 (aged 84); Freiberg
- Military career
- Allegiance: Nazi Germany
- Branch: Luftwaffe
- Service years: 1939–1945
- Rank: Oberleutnant (first lieutenant)
- Units: JG 52; JG 7
- Conflicts: World War II: Battle of the Caucasus; Battle of Kursk; Defense of the Reich
- Awards: Knight's Cross of the Iron Cross

Viktor Petermann (26 May 1916 – 19 May 2001) was a German Luftwaffe ace and recipient of the Knight's Cross of the Iron Cross during World War II. The Knight's Cross of the Iron Cross, and its variants were the highest awards in the military and paramilitary forces of Nazi Germany during World War II. Petermann was captured by American troops in May 1945, he was handed over to Soviet troops and was released in August 1945 due to his health problems. At the end of the war he flew the Messerschmitt Me 262 fighter jet. During his career was credited with 64 aerial victories, four of them, after he lost his arm in an air-combat, all on the Eastern Front.

== Early life and career ==
Petermann was born on 26 May 1916 in Weipert, at the time part of the district of Kaaden in the Sudetenland, present-day Vejprty in the Czech Republic. After graduation from school, he studied engineering and worked in the textile industry. A prewar glider pilot, Peterman joined the Luftwaffe in July 1939. Following flight and fighter pilot training from April 1940 to March 1941, (Note: Flight training in the Luftwaffe progressed through the levels A1, A2 and B1, B2, referred to as A/B flight training. A training included theoretical and practical training in aerobatics, navigation, long-distance flights and dead-stick landings. The B courses included high-altitude flights, instrument flights, night landings and training to handle the aircraft in difficult situations.) Petermann was posted to the Ergänzungsgruppe of Jagdgeschwader 52 (JG 52—52nd Fighter Wing), a supplementary training group, in October 1941. There, he was assigned to 2. Staffel (2nd squadron), at the time commanded by Oberleutnant Hans Oehlschläger and was based at Groningen Airfield in the Netherlands.

== World War II ==
World War II in Europe had begun on Friday 1 September 1939 when German forces invaded Poland. In mid-1942, Petermann was transferred to Geschwaderstab (headquarters unit) of JG 52. In preparation for Operation Fredericus, also known as the second Battle of Kharkov, the Geschwaderstab had moved to an airfield at Barvinkovo on 19 May 1942. In June, the Geschwaderstab also used an airfield at Grakowo, located approximately halfway between Kharkov and Kupiansk. Here on 4 June, Petermann damaged his Messerschmitt Bf 109 F-4 (Werknummer 13347—factory number) during an takeoff accident. The Geschwaderstab then moved to Vovchansk in support of Case Blue, the strategic summer offensive in southern Russia with the objective to capture the oil fields of Baku, Grozny and Maykop. Here on 1 July, Petermann was credited with his first aerial victory when he claimed a Lavochkin-Gorbunov-Gudkov LaGG-3 shot down near Volokonovka. The next day, he claimed a Mikoyan-Gurevich MiG-1, again shot down near Volokonovka.

On 13 August, the Geschwaderstab moved to an airfield Mineralnye Vody. Two day later, Petermann was credited with his third aerial victory, a Polikarpov I-153 which he rammmed, resulting in a forced landing which significantly damaged his own Bf 109 G-2 (Werknummer 14186). On 18 August, Petermann flew as wingman to the Geschwaderkommodore (wing commander) Major Gordon Gollob. Returning from this mission, his Bf 109 G-2 (Werknummer 14185) ran out of fuel, resulting in crash landing at Mineralnye Vody. The Geschwaderstab moved to an airfield at Prokhladny, also referred to as Ssoldatskaja by the Germans, on 20 September. Here, Petermann claimed two aerial victories, a MiG-1 on 29 September and a LaGG-3 on 4 October. For his achievements to date, Petermann was awarded the Iron Cross 1st Class (Eisernes Kreuz erster Klasse) on 16 October. On 30 October, Petermann and his wingman Oberfeldwebel Willi Grosse flew a combat air patrol in the area of Ordzhonikidzevskaya, present-day Sunzha. Without encountering enemy aircraft, the two attacked and strafed two armoured trains. On 19 January 1943, Peter flew a shuttle mission from Lemberg, present-day Lviv, to Zhytomyr. The flight ended in an emergency landing due to icing on his Bf 109 G-2 resulting in minor damage.

=== With II. Gruppe of JG 52 ===
Petermann was transferred to II. Gruppe (2nd group) of JG 52 in February 1943. There, he was assigned to 4. Staffel which at the time was under command of Oberleutnant Gerhard Barkhorn. On 10 February, II. Gruppe moved to an airfield at Slavyanskaya, fighting in the aerial battles over the Kuban bridgehead. Here the following day, Petermann was credited with his first aerial victory with II. Gruppe, his tenth in total, when he claimed a Polikarpov I-16 fighter shot down.

II./JG 52 insignia

From 13 March to 5 July, II. Gruppe was based at Anapa located on the northern coast of the Black Sea near the Sea of Azov and was fighting in the Battle of the Caucasus. Here by end of April, Petermann had increased his number of aerial victories to 26 and had been transferred to 5. Staffel then under command of Leutnant Helmut Haberda. By end of May, his number of aerial victories reached 44 claims. When on 8 May, Haberda was killed in action, Petermann's Staffel was briefly led by Leutnant Josef Zwernemann before command was given to Oberleutnant Wilhelm Batz on 26 May.

On 6 June, Petermann was wounded in aerial combat with Yakovlev Yak-1 fighters near Petrovskaya located approximately 20 kilometers (12 miles) northwest of Slavyanskaya. He made an emergency landing of his Bf 109 G-4 (Werknummer 19527) near Krasny Oktyabr located 40 kilometers (25 miles) west of Slavyanskaya at 18:00. He returned to his unit on 10 June. Petermann's number of aerial victories increased to 53 by end July 1943, making him the fourth most successful active fighter pilot of II. Gruppe at the time. For this, he received the German Cross in Gold (Deutsches Kreuz in Gold) on 23 July.

On 1 September, II. Gruppe was made complete again, reuniting with all three Staffeln at a makeshift airfield named Karlowka located approximately 50 kilometers (31 miles) east of Poltava. In September, Petermann was transferred to 6. Staffel, then under command of Leutnant Helmut Lipfert. By the end of September and credited with 60 aerial victories, Petermann was the third most successful active fighter pilot of II. Gruppe. On 1 October, Petermann became a victim of friendly fire when his Bf 109 G-6 (Werknummer 15851) was shot down by German anti-aircraft artillery resulting in an emergency landing at Nove Zaporizhzhya at 12:15. His injuries were severe, requiring the amputation of his left arm and a toe on his left foot. During his convalescence on 29 February 1944, Petermann was awarded the Knight's Cross of the Iron Cross (Ritterkreuz des Eisernen Kreuzes) for 60 aerial victories claimed.

=== Squadron leader and end of war ===
On 7 January 1945, Petermann was appointed Staffelkapitän (squadron leader) of 10. Staffel of JG 52. He succeeded Leutnant Karl Gratz who had temporarily led the Staffel after its former commander, Oberleutnant Friedrich Obleser, had been wounded on 30 December 1944. The Staffel was subordinated to III. Gruppe of JG 52 at the time headed by Hauptmann Wilhelm Batz and based at Kraków. When on 13 January Soviet forces launched the East Prussian offensive, III. Gruppe was moved to an airfield at Weidengut, present-day Wierzbie. Here on 16 January, Petermann claimed Yakovlev Yak-9. On 1 February 1945, Batz was transferred and command of III. Gruppe went to Major Adolf Borchers. On 11 February, Petermann claimed another Yak-9 fighter.

Flying to Schweidnitz, present-day Świdnica, on 16 March, Petermann and his wingman Unteroffizier Schreck interceped a flight of 20 Petlyakov Pe-2 bombers and 15 Bell P-39 Airacobra fighters north of Grottkau, present-day Grodków. Attacking from above, both pilots claimed a P-39 shot down. On 22 March, Petermann claimed his last confirmed aerial victory, a Yak-9 fighter. On 30 March, Petermann was transferred to III. Gruppe of Jagdgeschwader 7 "Nowotny", the first operational jet fighter unit. Command of 10. Staffel was again passed to Gratz. Petermann claimed one probable aerial victory flying the Messerschmitt Me 262 jet fighter.

Since Petermann had difficulties adapting to the Me 262, he returned to JG 52 on 11 April. Here, he was promoted to Oberleutnant (first lieutenant) on 1 May. Petermann finished the war credited with 66 aerial victories, then the third most successful fighter pilot of III. Gruppe. On 7 May, with the exception of II. Gruppe, JG 52 moved to Deutsch Brod, present-day Havlíčkův Brod, on 7 May. Here, they surrendered to the U.S. Army but were handed over to the Soviet Union and became a prisoner of war.

== Later life ==
Petermann was released from Soviet captivity on 26 July 1945. He settled in East Germany, working on a farm. In 1954, he became an engineer and technical advisor for a farm machine manufacturer. Petermann died on 19 May 2001 at the age of 84 in Freiberg, Germany.

== Summary of career ==
=== Aerial victory claims ===
According to US historian David T. Zabecki, Petermann was credited with 64 aerial victories. Spick also lists him with 64 aerial victories claimed in an unknown number of combat missions. All of his aerial victories were achieved over the Eastern Front. Mathews and Foreman, authors of Luftwaffe Aces — Biographies and Victory Claims, researched the German Federal Archives and found records for 64 aerial victory claims, plus one further unconfirmed claim, all of which claimed on the Eastern Front.

Victory claims were logged to a map-reference (PQ = Planquadrat), for example "PQ 54522". The Luftwaffe grid map (Jägermeldenetz) covered all of Europe, western Russia and North Africa and was composed of rectangles measuring 15 minutes of latitude by 30 minutes of longitude, an area of about 360 square miles (930 km^{2}). These sectors were then subdivided into 36 smaller units to give a location area 3 km × 4 km (1.9 mi × 2.5 mi) in size.

Chronicle of aerial victories
This and the – (dash) indicates unconfirmed aerial victory claims for which Petermann did not receive credit. This and the ? (question mark) indicates information discrepancies listed by Prien, Stemmer, Rodeike, Bock, Mathews and Foreman.
| Claim | Date | Time | Type | Location | Claim | Date | Time | Type | Location |
– Stab of Jagdgeschwader 52 – Eastern Front — 17 May 1942 – 3 February 1943
| 1 | 1 July 1942 | 14:55 | LaGG-3 | vicinity of Volokonovka | 6 | 7 September 1942 | 12:17? (Note: According to Mathews and Foreman claimed at 12:15.) | Boston | PQ 54522 |
| 2 | 2 July 1942 | 09:25 | MiG-1 | vicinity of Volokonovka | 7 | 17 September 1942 | 14:27 | Su-2 (Seversky) | PQ 54331 |
| 3 | 15 August 1942 | 06:45 | I-153 | PQ 34272 | 8 | 29 September 1942 | 15:48 | MiG-1 | PQ 44591 |
| 4 | 24 August 1942 | 15:04 | one-engined bomber | PQ 54194 | 9 | 4 October 1942 | 15:04 | LaGG-3 | PQ 44432 |
| 5 | 25 August 1942 | 15:20 | Boston | PQ 44274 | | | | | |
– 4. Staffel of Jagdgeschwader 52 – Eastern Front — 4 February – 18 April 1943
| 10 | 11 February 1943 | 11:40 | I-16 | PQ 34 Ost 8512; 10 km (6.2 mi) north of Novocherkassk | 13 | 12 March 1943 | 07:40 | R-5 | PQ 34 Ost 85152 vicinity of Erdol |
| 11 | 12 February 1943 | 14:38 | I-153 | PQ 34 Ost 85624; Black Sea, south of Nowe Mikhaylovskoye | 14 | 19 March 1943 | 09:30 | Yak-1 | PQ 34 Ost 86594; Ivanovskaya |
| 12 | 13 February 1943 | 11:37 | I-153 | PQ 34 Ost 85194 east of Derbentskaya | 15 | 18 April 1943 | 16:20 | Il-2 m.H. (Note: The "m.H." refers to an Ilyushin Il-2 with rear gunner (mit Heckschütze).) | PQ 34 Ost 75494; 4 km (2.5 mi) east of Novorossiysk |
– 5. Staffel of Jagdgeschwader 52 – Eastern Front — 20 April – September 1943
| 16 | 20 April 1943 | 08:40 | Yak-1 | PQ 34 Ost 85181, Neberdschajewskaja vicinity of Usun | 37 | 9 May 1943 | 18:22 | LaGG-3 | PQ 34 Ost 85141, northwest Abinskaja east of Krymsk |
| 17 | 20 April 1943 | 15:51 | LaGG-3 | PQ 34 Ost 75452; 8 km (5.0 mi) south of Novorossiysk | 38 | 22 May 1943 | 06:15 | R-5 | PQ 34 Ost 96724 east of Krasnodar |
| 18 | 21 April 1943 | 07:10 | LaGG-3 | PQ 34 Ost 75461; Black Sea, 5 km (3.1 mi) south of Kabardinka | 39 | 26 May 1943 | 18:30 | Yak-1 | PQ 34 Ost 76891 vicinity of Kijewskoje |
| 19 | 23 April 1943 | 05:02 | Yak-1 | PQ 34 Ost 75415, southeast of Kabardinka | 40 | 27 May 1943 | 14:10 | P-39 | PQ 34 Ost 76864, Kruglik vicinity of Kecskemet |
| 20 | 23 April 1943 | 05:08 | Yak-1 | PQ 34 Ost 7543, Novorossiysk | 41 | 28 May 1943 | 10:51 | P-39 | PQ 34 Ost 76892, northeast Kijewskoje vicinity of Kijewskoje |
| 21 | 26 April 1943? (Note: According to Mathews and Foreman claimed on 25 April 1943.) | 12:36 | R-5 | PQ 34 Ost 75733 west of Nowomyschowskaja | 42 | 28 May 1943 | 13:21 | Yak-1 | PQ 34 Ost 75232, southeast Kijewskoje north of Krymsk |
| 22 | 26 April 1943? | 12:39 | R-5 | PQ 34 Ost 85732 west of Nowomyschowskaja | — (Note: This unconfirmed claim is not listed by Prien, Stemmer, Rodeike and Bock.) | 28 May 1943 | 18:00+ | Il-2 | |
| 23 | 27 April 1943 | 17:05 | LaGG-3 | PQ 34 Ost 85142 vicinity of Abinsk | 43 | 31 May 1943 | 08:00 | Yak-1 | PQ 34 Ost 76864, Kruglik north of Kecskemet |
| 24 | 28 April 1943 | 11:48 | Yak-1 | PQ 34 Ost 86783; Bondarenka | 44 | 31 May 1943 | 14:07 | Pe-2 | PQ 34 Ost 86771 vicinity of Bondarenka |
| 25 | 29 April 1943 | 13:15 | LaGG-3 | PQ 34 Ost 85161 vicinity of Abinsk | 45 | 1 June 1943 | 18:18 | Yak-1 | PQ 34 Ost 76892, northeast Kijewskoje vicinity of Kijewskoje |
| 26 | 30 April 1943 | 16:39 | Spitfire | PQ 34 Ost 85751 vicinity of Abinsk | 46 | 2 June 1943 | 10:45 | P-39 | PQ 34 Ost 76993 |
| 27 | 2 May 1943 | 08:52 | LaGG-3 | PQ 34 Ost 85172 southwest of Abinsk | 47 | 4 June 1943 | 18:17 | LaGG-3 | PQ 34 Ost 75491; Black Sea, 15 km (9.3 mi) south of Kabardinka |
| 28 | 3 May 1943 | 06:07 | LaGG-3 | PQ 34 Ost 85161 vicinity of Nowenjkij | 48 | 4 June 1943 | 18:21 | LaGG-3 | PQ 34 Ost 75452; 8 km (5.0 mi) south of Novorossiysk |
| 29 | 3 May 1943 | 06:34 | LaGG-3 | PQ 34 Ost 85181 northeast of Usun | 49 | 23 July 1943 | 17:34 | Il-2 m.H. | PQ 34 Ost 76894, east Kijewskoje vicinity of Kijewskoje |
| 30 | 4 May 1943 | 14:58 | Yak-1 | PQ 34 Ost 75324; Black Sea, south of Anapa | 50 | 26 July 1943 | 06:18 | Il-2 m.H. | PQ 34 Ost 76774; Black Sea, west of Blagowetschskoje |
| 31 | 4 May 1943 | 15:18 | LaGG-3 | PQ 34 Ost 85143 southeast of Krymsk | 51 | 26 July 1943 | 06:25 | Il-2 m.H. | PQ 34 Ost 75151; Black Sea, west of Anapa |
| 32 | 5 May 1943 | 09:22 | Yak-1 | PQ 34 Ost 85261 north of Nowo Bakanskaja | 52 | 26 July 1943 | 18:20 | Il-2 m.H. | PQ 34 Ost 75262, southwest of Krymskaja south of Krymsk |
| 33 | 5 May 1943 | 13:32 | LaGG-3? (Note: According to Mathews and Foreman claimed as a Lavochkin La-5.) | PQ 34 Ost 85184, 10 km (6.2 mi) southeast of Abinskaja southeast of Tscherkassowski | 53 | 31 July 1943 | 18:20 | P-39 | PQ 34 Ost 75291, Neberdshajewskaja vicinity of Neberdshajewskaja |
| 34 | 5 May 1943 | 17:32 | LaGG-3 | PQ 34 Ost 76893, southeast Kijewskoje south of Bakanskij | 54 | 7 September 1943 | 17:12 | Pe-2 | PQ 34 Ost 50242; 25 km (16 mi) southwest of Olshany |
| 35 | 6 May 1943 | 16:07 | Yak-4 | PQ 34 Ost 75454; Black Sea, southwest of Anapa | 55 | 14 September 1943 | 07:17 | Yak-1 | PQ 35 Ost 50141; 40 km (25 mi) south-southwest of Bogodechow |
| 36 | 8 May 1943 | 17:58 | Yak-1 | PQ 34 Ost 85171, southwest Abinskaja vicinity of Usun | | | | | |
– 6. Staffel of Jagdgeschwader 52 – Eastern Front — September – 1 October 1943
| 56 | 25 September 1943 | 11:57 | Yak-1 | PQ 35 Ost 11744; 10 km (6.2 mi) east of Pereiaslav-Khmelnytskyi | 59 | 25 September 1943 | 12:19 | Il-2 m.H. | PQ 35 Ost 10153 vicinity of Rabotschi |
| 57 | 25 September 1943 | 12:09 | Il-2 m.H. | PQ 35 Ost 11783; Pereiaslav-Khmelnytskyi | 60 | 26 September 1943 | 07:32 | P-40 | PQ 35 Ost 10133; 15 km (9.3 mi) southeast of Pereiaslav-Khmelnytskyi |
| 58 | 25 September 1943 | 12:12 | Il-2 m.H. | PQ 35 Ost 11753 vicinity of Jerkownik | | | | | |
– 10. Staffel of Jagdgeschwader 52 – Eastern Front — 1945
| 61 | 16 January 1945 | 12:06 | Yak-9 | PQ 91653 | 63 | 16 March 1945 | 17:08 | P-39 | PQ 71342 northeast of Münsterberg |
| 62 | 11 February 1945 | 12:50 | Yak-9 | PQ 71167 | 64 | 22 March 1945 | 15:46 | Yak-9 | PQ 71471 west of Schädeburg |

=== Awards ===
- Iron Cross (1939)
  - 2nd Class
  - 1st Class (16 October 1942)
- Wound Badge (1939)
  - in Silver (22 December 1943)
- German Cross in Gold on 23 July 1943 as Feldwebel in the 5./Jagdgeschwader 52
- Honor Goblet of the Luftwaffe on 9 August 1943 as Feldwebel and pilot (Note: According to Obermaier on 9 September 1943.)
- Knight's Cross of the Iron Cross on 29 February 1944 as Leutnant and pilot in the III./Jagdgeschwader 52 (Note: According to Scherzer as pilot in the 6./Jagdgeschwader 52.)

== Works ==
- Petermann, Viktor (2004). Klinnert, Falk (ed.). Luftkrieg 1939–1945—Der Jagdflieger Viktor Petermann: Pilot im Jagdgeschwader 52 [Air War 1939–1945—The Fighter Pilot Viktor Petermann: Pilot in Jagdgeschwader 52] (in German). OV Verlag. OCLC 918505663.
