= Chomutov–Vejprty/Reitzenhain railway =

Railway line in the Czech Republic

Chomutov–Křimov–Reitzenhain
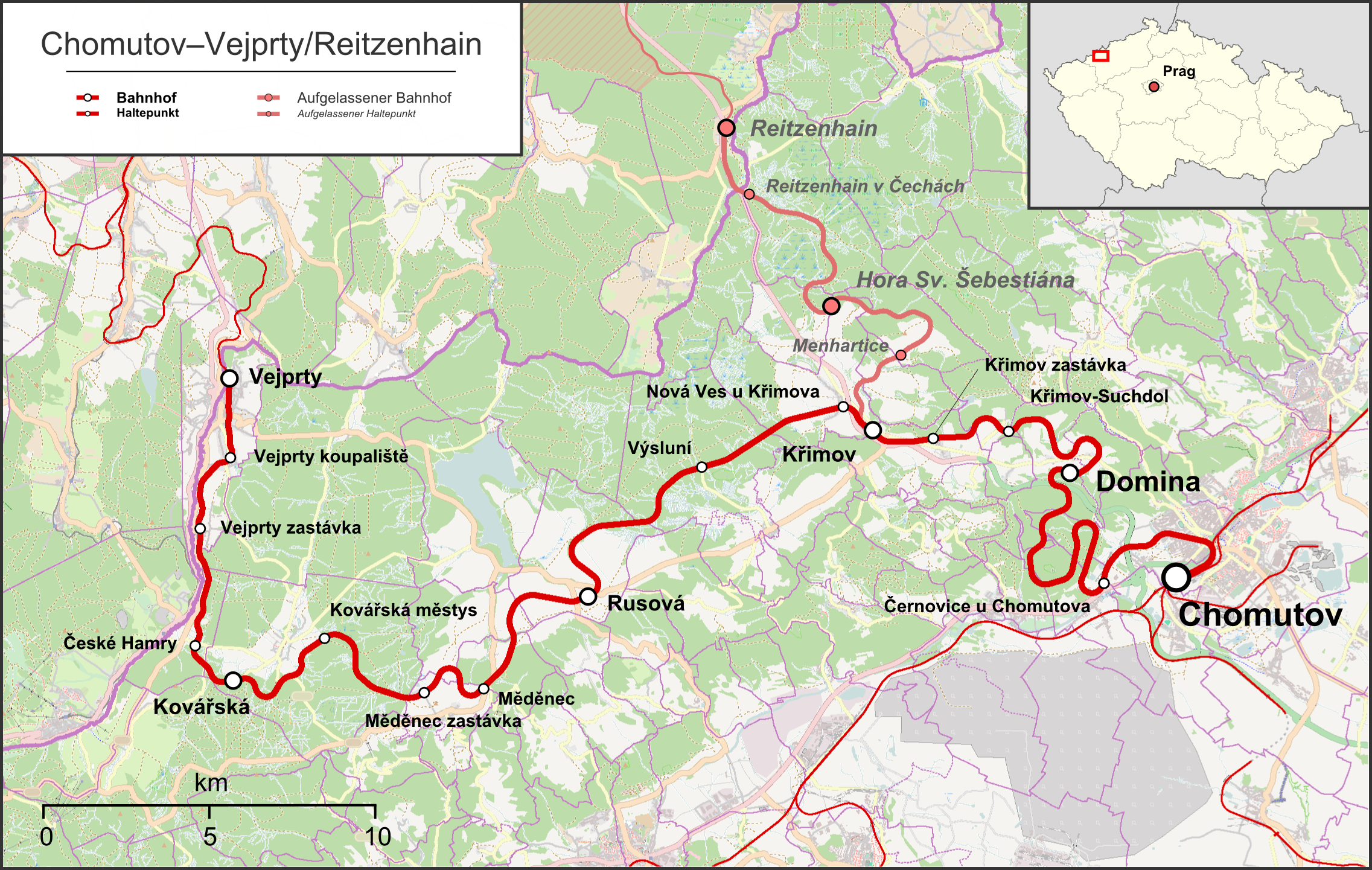

Technical
- Track gauge: 1,435 mm (4 ft 8 1/2 in)
- Operating speed: 60 km/h (37 mph) (maximum)
- Maximum incline: 20%

Křimov–Vejprty

Technical
- Track gauge: 1,435 mm (4 ft 8 1/2 in)
- Operating speed: 60 km/h (37 mph) (maximum)

The Chomutov–Reitzenhain railway and its branch to Vejprty is a branch line (Czech: regionální dráha) in the Czech Republic, that was originally built and operated by the Buschtěhrad Railway Company (BEB). It begins in Chomutov (Komotau), crosses the Ore Mountains, and ends today in the border station of Vejprty (Weipert), where there is a connexion to the German railway network over the Vejprty–Annaberg-Buchholz railway. The branch from Křimov to Reitzenhain has been closed since 1972.

== Sources ==
- Jan Kadlec: Zaniklá železniční trať Křimov–Reitzenhain, Oblastní muzeum v Chomutově, 2005
- Miroslav Jelen: Zrušené železniční tratě v Čechách, na Moravě a ve Slezsku, Dokořán 2009, ISBN 978-80-7363-129-1
- Siegfried Bufe, Heribert Schröpfer: Eisenbahnen im Sudetenland, Bufe-Fachbuchverlag, Egglham 1991, ISBN 3-922138-42-X
- Zdeněk Hudec u.a.: Atlas drah České republiky 2006-2007, 2. Auflage; Verlag Pavel Malkus, Prague, 2006, ISBN 80-87047-00-1
