= Pressnitz Valley Railway =

Railway line in Germany

Wolkenstein–Jöhstadt
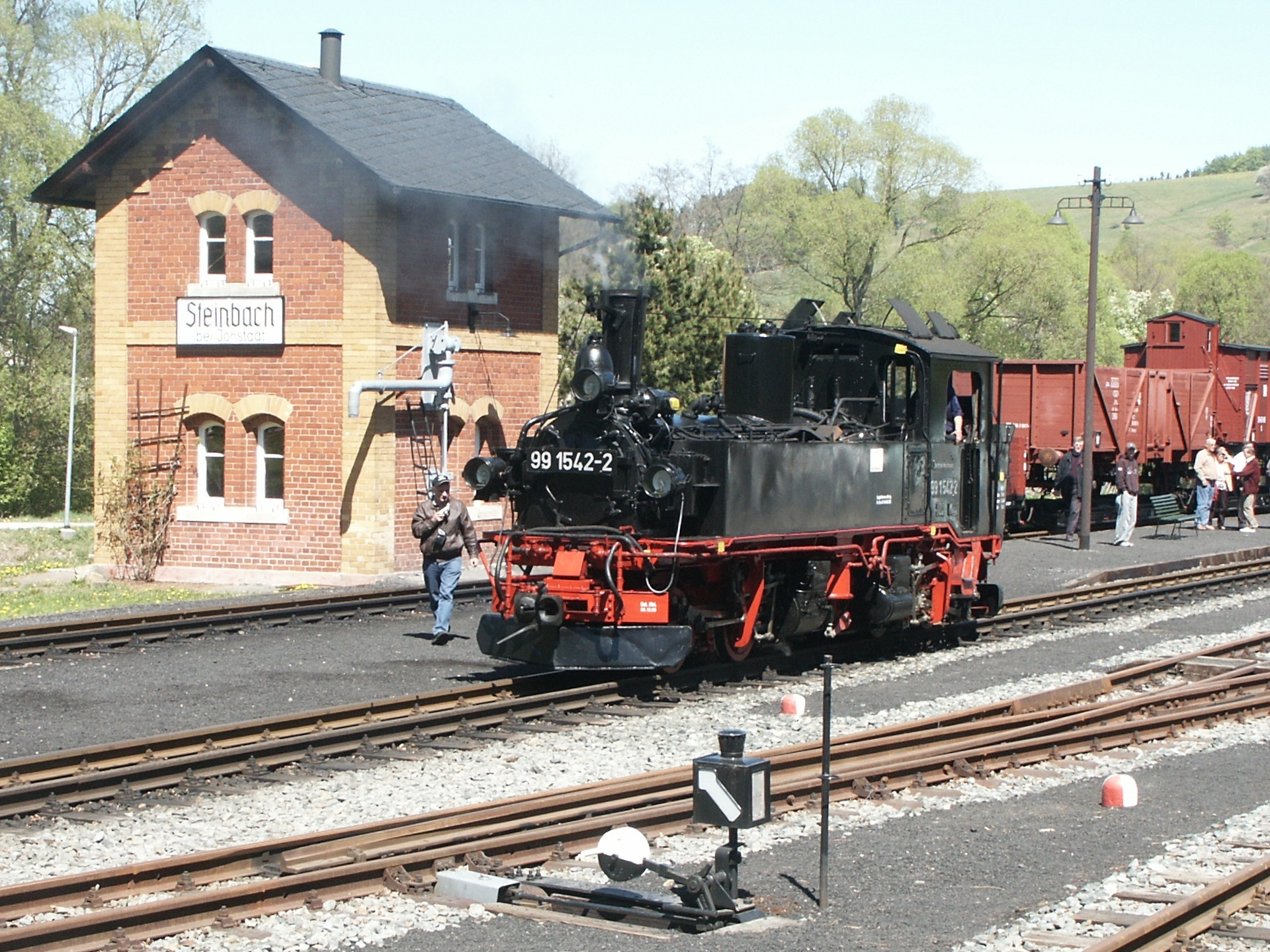
- The former Saxon IV K, no. 99 1542, in the restored station of Steinbach (2008)

Overview
- Line number: 6975
- Coordinates: 50°31′49″N 13°07′48″E

Service
- Route number: 422 (1984); 12600 (2008);

Technical
- Line length: 24.328 km (15.117 mi)
- Track gauge: 750 mm (2 ft 5 1/2 in)
- Minimum radius: 80 m (262 ft)
- Operating speed: 30 km/h (18.6 mph) max.
- Maximum incline: 2.5 %

The Pressnitz Valley Railway (German: Preßnitztalbahn) was a narrow gauge railway line in Saxony, Germany. It used to climb from Wolkenstein on the standard gauge Annaberg-Buchholz–Flöha railway through the valley of river Preßnitz (Czech: Přísečnice) to Jöhstadt on the border with Bohemia. It was dismantled in the second half of the 1980s, however the Steinbach - Jöhstadt section was rebuilt as a museum railway after the fall of communism in East Germany.

== History ==
Construction started in 1891 and the railway was opened on 1 June 1892. In May 1893 the line was extended to the border with Bohemia. There were several projects to connect the line to Bohemian standard gauge lines, with the aim of enabling the importation of lignite from the Most Basin. However, the proposed link with border station at Reitzenhain on the Chomutov–Reitzenhain and Reitzenhain–Flöha railway lines was rejected, as well as plans to build an extension to the Chomutov–Vejprty/Reitzenhain railway. From 1911 freight was carried using transporter trailers.

The Pressnitz Valley Railway was the last Saxon narrow gauge railway to be closed by the East German government. Passenger services were terminated in 1984; the transportation of freight for the refrigerator factory in Niederschmiedeberg ceased in 1986. The process of gradually dismantling the line took several years, from January 1984 until the summer 1989. Locomotives and wagons were transferred to other Saxon narrow gauge railways or decommissioned.

== Preservation ==
As early as 1988, a society for the preservation of the railway, the Interessengemeinschaft Preßnitztalbahn, was formed in Großrückerswalde. Its aim was to preserve the remaining fragments that were left after dismantling. After the fall of communism in Eastern Europe, the club turned into a legal entity and presented a bold plan to rebuild at least part of the former narrow gauge line. Reconstruction began as soon as 1990, with the restoration of the locomotive shed in Jöhstadt. In the following years, the track from Jöhstadt station to Steinbach station was gradually laid and a week-long celebration took place in 2000.

The museum railway operates every weekend from May to October, as well as on public holidays (Easter, May Day, Ascension, Pentecost, German Unity Day) and around Christmas and New Year's Day.

== Rügen operations ==
Since 2008, the operating company Eisenbahn-Bau- und Betriebsgesellschaft Pressnitztalbahn operates the Rügen narrow-gauge railway (which uses the same 750 mm gauge) and also the standard-gauge Bergen auf Rügen–Lauterbach Mole railway.
