= Vejprty =

- Town
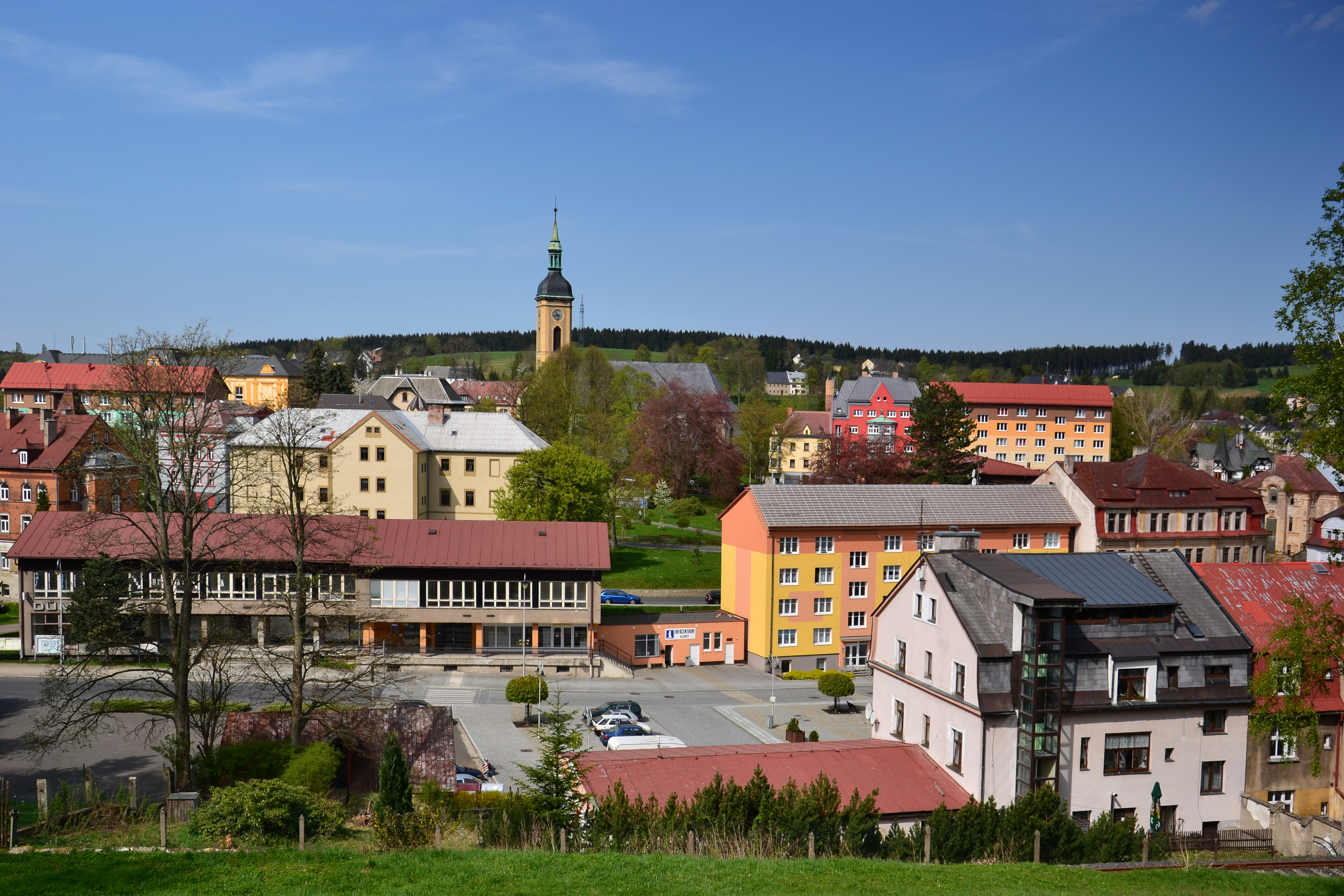
- Centre of the town

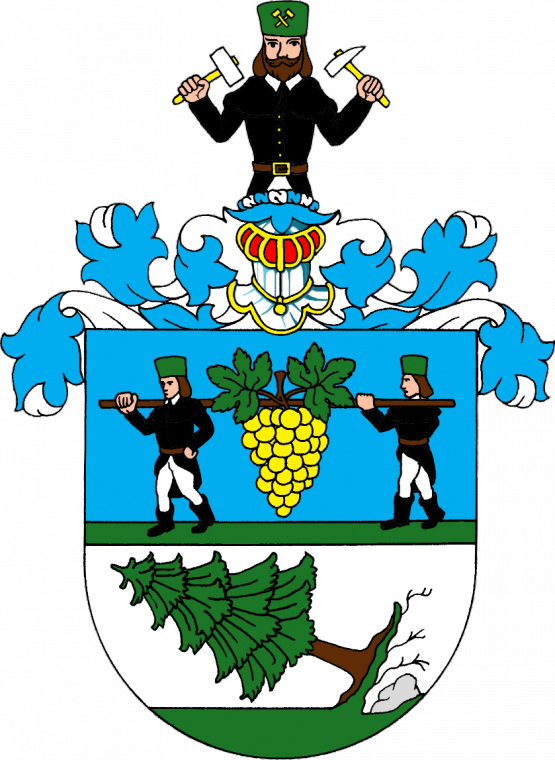
- Flag Coat of arms

- Location in the Czech Republic
- Coordinates: 50°29′30″N 13°1′58″E
- Country: Czech Republic
- Region: Ústí nad Labem
- District: Chomutov
- First mentioned: 1506

Government
  - Mayor: Jitka Gavdunová (ODS)

Area
  - Total: 9.77 km^{2} (3.77 sq mi)
- Elevation: 725 m (2,379 ft)

Population (2026-01-01)
  - Total: 2,750
  - Density: 281/km^{2} (729/sq mi)
- Time zone: UTC+1 (CET)
  - Summer (DST): UTC+2 (CEST)
- Postal code: 431 91
- Website: www.vejprty.cz

Vejprty (Czech pronunciation: [ˈvɛjpr̩tɪ]; German: Weipert) is a town in Chomutov District in the Ústí nad Labem Region of the Czech Republic. It has about 2,800 inhabitants. The town is located on the Polana Stream in the Ore Mountains, along the border with Germany. Before World War II, it was a large town with more than 12,000 inhabitants.

== Administrative division ==
Vejprty consists of three municipal parts (in brackets population according to the 2021 census):

- Vejprty (2,651)
- České Hamry (39)
- Výsada (5)

== Etymology ==
The historical German name Weipert is derived from the German personal name Weippert. The Czech name Vejprty was created by transcription.

== Geography ==
Vejprty is located about 26 km (16 mi) west of Chomutov and 30 km (19 mi) southeast of Karlovy Vary. It lies in the Ore Mountains. The highest point is below the top of the mountain Vlčí kopec, at 970 m (3,182 ft) above sea level. The territory stretches along the border with Germany, from which it is separated by the Polana Stream. It borders the German municipalities of Bärenstein and Oberwiesenthal.

== History ==
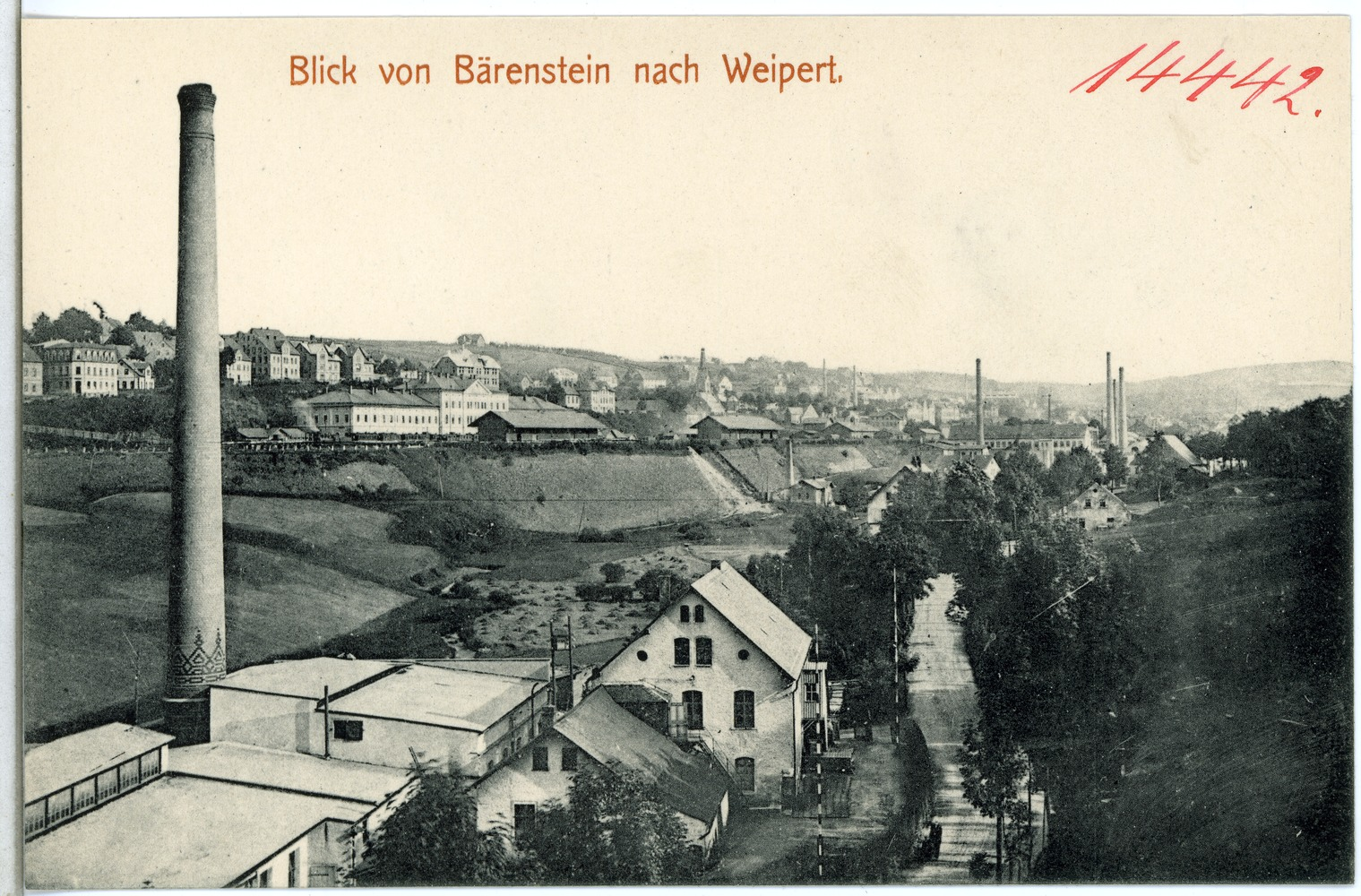
Vejprty in 1912

The first written mention of Vejprty is from 1506. In 1550, silver ore was discovered in the area. The mining settlement of Neugeschrei (today a locality of Vejprty called Nové Zvolání) was established near the newly created adit. In 1607, Emperor Rudolf II allowed all the miners and craftsmen settled here to deal freely with their property. Vejprty was promoted to a royal mining town in 1617.

Vejprty was badly damaged during the Thirty Years' War by the army of Johan Banér, and the mines were flooded. In 1688, mining was resumed and the town began to flourish again. In the first half of the 18th century, however, profitability began to decline, and mining stopped in 1751. Although mining resumed briefly in the 19th century, it ended for good in 1845. The livelihood of the inhabitants was thus gradually reoriented to the manufacture of rifles and to lacemaking. Rapid development took place in the second half of the 19th century. It was helped by the establishment of the Chomutov–Vejprty railway, which was put into operation in 1872.

== Demographics ==
Historical population

Year	Pop.	±%
1869	5,593	—
1880	6,573	+17.5%
1890	8,499	+29.3%
1900	10,212	+20.2%
1910	12,097	+18.5%

Year	Pop.	±%
1921	10,615	−12.3%
1930	12,222	+15.1%
1950	4,788	−60.8%
1961	4,674	−2.4%
1970	3,682	−21.2%

Year	Pop.	±%
1980	3,897	+5.8%
1991	3,320	−14.8%
2001	3,336	+0.5%
2011	2,950	−11.6%
2021	2,695	−8.6%

Source: Censuses

== Transport ==
Vejprty is located on the railway line Chomutov–Cranzahl. However, trains run on it only on weekends in the summer season.

== Sights ==
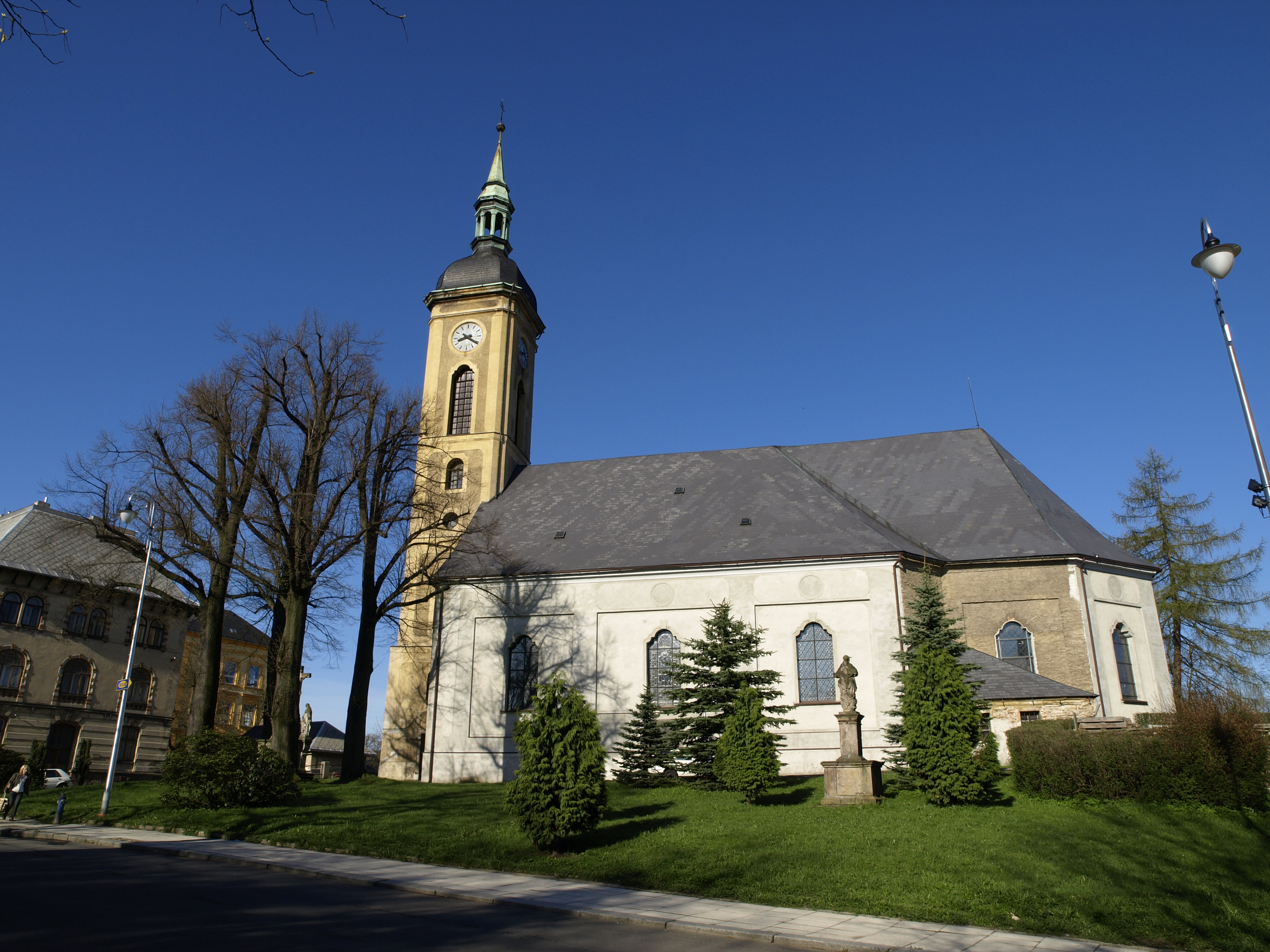
Church of All Saints

The most important monument is the Church of All Saints. The original church was built in 1660. In 1777–1785, it was rebuilt in the Rococo style. The church tower was rebuilt after a fire caused by lightning in 1827, and in 1912 it was raised to a height of 53 metres (174 ft).

A valuable building is the Chapel of Saint Martin. It dates from the 16th century, when it replaced an old wooden church.

== Notable people ==
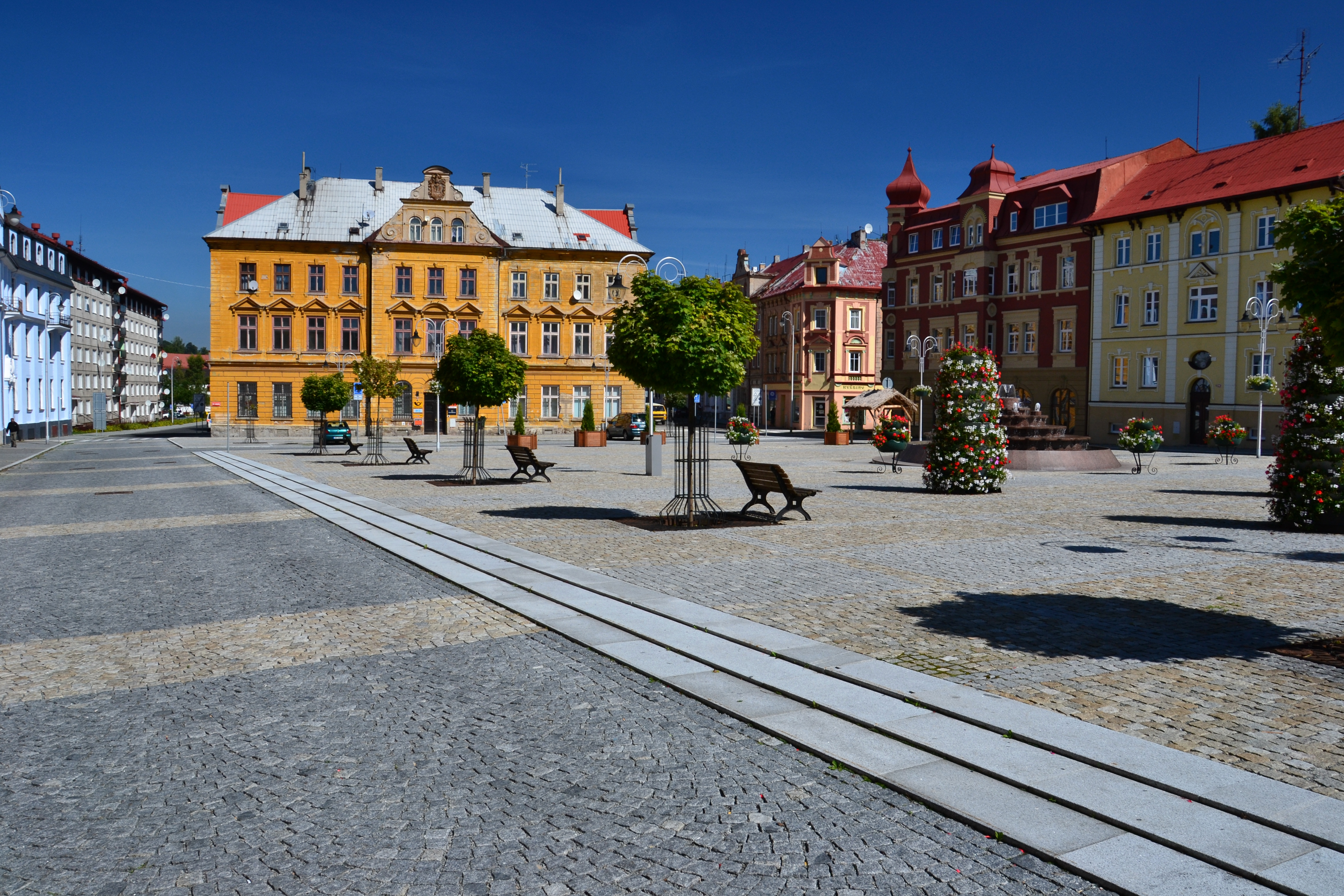
Town square

- Ottokar Tumlirz (1856–1928), Austrian physicist
- Theodor Innitzer (1875–1955), cardinal and Archbishop of Vienna
- Wilhelm Dick (1897–1980), German ski jumper
- Viktor Petermann (1916–2001), German Luftwaffe fighter ace
- Walter W. Müller (born 1933), German academic

== Twin towns – sister cities ==
Vejprty is twinned with:

- Bärenstein, Germany

Vejprty also cooperates with Gunzenhausen, Germany.
