= Bärenstein =

- Municipality
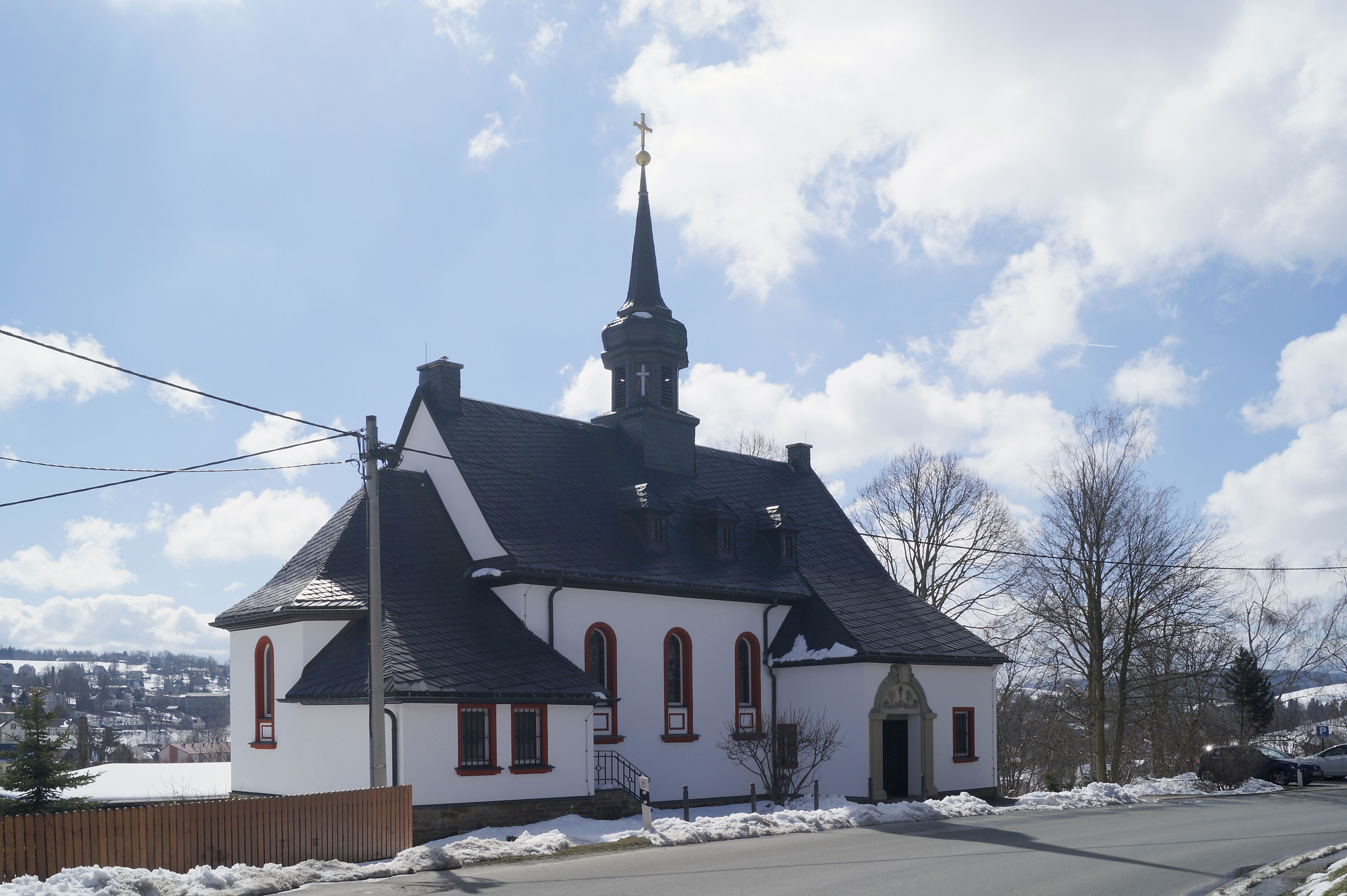
- Church of Saint Boniface

- Coat of arms

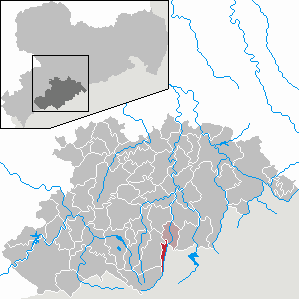
- Location of Bärenstein within Erzgebirgskreis district
- Interactive map of Bärenstein
- Location within Germany Location within Saxony
- Coordinates: 50°29′53″N 13°1′38″E
- Country: Germany
- State: Saxony
- District: Erzgebirgskreis

Government
  - Mayor (2019–26): Silvio Wagner

Area
  - Total: 5.45 km^{2} (2.10 sq mi)
- Elevation: 713 m (2,339 ft)

Population (2025-12-31)
  - Total: 2,134
  - Density: 392/km^{2} (1,010/sq mi)
- Time zone: UTC+01:00 (CET)
  - Summer (DST): UTC+02:00 (CEST)
- Postal codes: 09471
- Dialling codes: 037347
- Vehicle registration: ERZ, ANA, ASZ, AU, MAB, MEK, STL, SZB, ZP
- Website: www.baerenstein-erzgebirge.de

Bärenstein is a municipality in the district of Erzgebirgskreis, in Saxony, Germany.

== History ==
From 1952 to 1990, Bärenstein was part of the Bezirk Karl-Marx-Stadt of East Germany.
