= Auguste Müller =

German folk carver

Auguste Müller (1847 in Seiffen – 1930) was a German folk carver, who was involved in Seiffen's traditional wooden toymaking. Her works made from waste wood are now counted among the most valuable pieces of Ore Mountain folk art. She followed in her father's footsteps as a toymaker. Müller was noted for her use of metaphor in her carvings, which she made with a particular sensitivity. The Erzgebirgisches Spielzeugmuseum in Seiffen is in possession of some of her works such as the religious "Weihnachtstempel", which she made in 1918.
