= Ore Mountain folk art =

Folk art

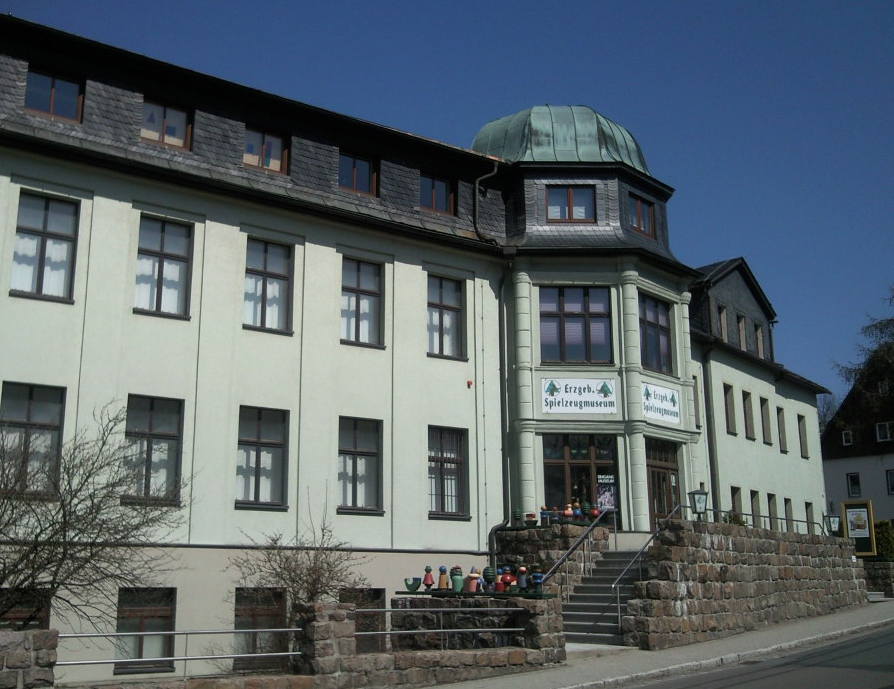
Ore Mountain Toy Museum in Seiffen

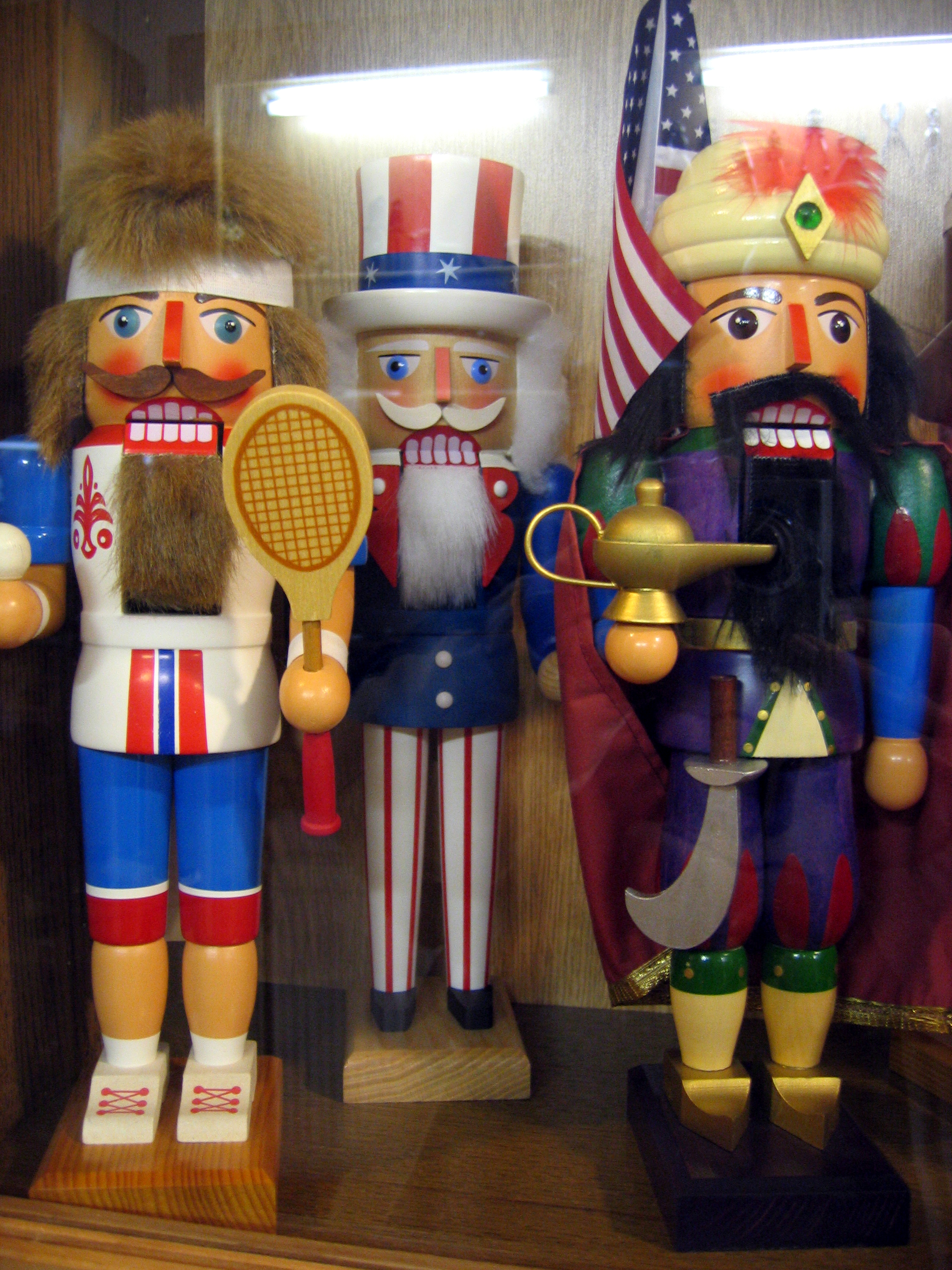
Exhibits in the Nutcracker Museum in Neuhausen

Ore Mountain folk art (German: Erzgebirgische Volkskunst) is a well-known form of highly artistic wood carving from East Germany. It encompasses the diverse forms of expression of the creative work beyond the classical or the modern arts, and in particular the production of figures, sculptures and paintings. In a broader sense, the people's poetry, literature, and the Ore Mountain songs are in itself the folk art. The Ore Mountains claim to be the largest, enclosed folk art area in Germany.

One of the more important aspects of the Ore Mountain folk art is the production of material products. The art's historical origin is closely linked to mining, which has been significant in shaping the development of the Ore Mountains since the 12th century. The economic downturn of the mining industry, or its widespread decline in the 19th century, encouraged the emergence of supplementary and replacement income, depending on local conditions. The motifs of this Ore Mountain wood art have a close connection to mining and the working and living environment of the miners, thus the logo of the craftsmen is a miner on a rocking horse. In addition to straw weaving and lace making, this included in particular the artistic woodworking that characterises and dominates the concept of Ore Mountain folk art.

Typical creations include Christmas decorations and products such as wooden miners' figures (Bergmannsfigur), Christmas angels (Weihnachtsengel), Reifendrehen figures of animals made by wood turning, smoking figures (Räuchermann), Christmas mountains (Weihnachtsberge) and Christmas pyramids (Flügelpyramiden), as well as candle arches (Schwibbogen), nutcrackers, and music boxes. Even today these are made entirely by hand, primarily in small craft businesses.

The centre for the manufacture of Ore Mountain folk art lies in the region around the village of Seiffen, which is also known as the Toy Corner (Spielzeugwinkel). Here most of the manufacturers have joined Dregeno, the association of woodcarvers, sculptors, wood and toy makers. One of the largest collections of folk art is at the Ore Mountain Toy Museum in Seiffen. In the neighbouring village of Neuhausen is the first nutcracker museum in Europe, which houses more than 5,000 examples, the largest collection of nutcrackers in the world.

== Historical origins ==
=== Ore Mountain wood art ===
Woodworking has always been an important industry in the well-forested Ore Mountains. Ore mining, which started in the 12th century in Freiberg and covered large parts of the mountains in the following centuries, was constrained to the use of pitwood. Wood was also the most important material for the construction of buildings and for the production of everyday objects (dishware, furniture, tools etc.). For the 15th and 16th century, the electoral wood regulations for the area around Lauterstein (1560) and the Purschenstein wood ruling (1588) verified the activities of woodworkers who made wooden vessels and tools. In another village, Grünhainichen, nowadays a centre for wooden toy production in the Ore Mountains, a merchant for wooden products was mentioned as early as 1578.

Nevertheless, the majority of the population, especially in mining villages, were working in the mining industry or in mining-related jobs. Mining was, however, subject to economic fluctuations. In times of war, like the Thirty Years' War (1618–1648) or the Seven Years' War (1756–1783), mining was almost brought to a standstill. On the one hand, additional problems occurred when the mining industry had to penetrate into lower layers of the mountains after the mining of the ore-rich strata near the surface, the so-called Iron Hat, were exploited. As a consequence, the decreasing ratio of costs and benefits led to a standstill in some places, as it was no longer economically viable. On the other hand, some of the deposits were simply demineralised after centuries of mining.

In these times, where mining declined and became even extinct, the search for additional jobs or replacement income became more important. Physiographic circumstances left little scope for agricultural work. Thus it seemed natural to intensify woodworking. Therefore, new branches of wood processing developed quickly in the Western Ore Mountains. In the Schneeberg area and Annaberg, it was especially woodcarving, whereas in the centre of the Ore Mountains, around the villages Marienberg, Pobershau and Seiffen, the woodturning technique was professionally operated from the outset, in contrast to the woodcarving occupation.

In the middle of the 17th century, the professions of a faceplate turner (a lathe operator working with plates) and a spindle turner (a lathe operator working with spindles) were created, who initially mainly produced items of daily use. Over time, the production of toys and wooden figures such as miners, angels and Christmas pyramids developed, which were also produced in large sizes.

In pre-Christmas season, the face of villages in the Ore Mountains is characterized by Christmas pyramids and large Diaphragm arches, which are put up. Setting up the Christmas Pyramids is celebrated in some villages (so called "Pyramid push-start") as the official start of the Advent season. In December 1967, the Deutsche Post of the GDR issued two stamps with motives of Ore Mountain folk art. One of the stamps with a denomination value of 10 Pfennig, showed a nutcracker and two Räuchermännchen. The other, with a denomination value of 20 Pfennig, showed angels of light and miners. The stamps were designed by Dietrich Dorfstecher.

Especially in connection with Christmas markets, objects such as Christmas Pyramids and life-sized (or even larger than life-size) figures in the Räuchermännchen style are also set up in other regions of Germany. Not all of those objects have been manufactured in the Ore Mountains. For example: the biggest nutcrackers and Räuchermännchen in the Ore Mountain style, presented on Christmas Markets and shown at the CentrO-Christmas Market in Oberhausen, have been produced in Neuenkirchen-Vörden.

The development of this branch can not only be seen in the geographical distribution of products in "Ore Mountain Style", but also in the increasing diversity of motives for traditional objects. This diversity is clearly shown in the nutcracker museum in Neuhausen. Even in the Ore Mountains, new creations, which have little to do with products of the early days, are being developed. One of those products is an extremely slim, dark-skinned figure of an angel. In the meantime, the trend is towards high-priced products. For example: a shop in Seiffen offers a Christmas Pyramid which costs more than €10,000. It is controversial whether the products manufactured in the Ore Mountains area can still be marked as "handcrafted" even though more and more work steps in the production are carried out by machines.

== Protection of folk art from foreign competition ==
"Ore Mountain folk art" ist not only a generic term for products which are associated with the typical "Ore Mountain style" (and are also manufactured in the Ore Mountains area), but also a registered wordmark of the association of craftsmen and toy manufacturers from the Ore Mountains area.

The wordmark only protects from a misuse of the term "Ore Mountain folk art" by manufacturers or salesmen selling products which are not made in the Ore Mountains area or by order of companies located in this region. However, it does not protect from foreign manufacturers who produce articles in an "Ore Mountains style", but do not claim that these products are made traditionally solely in the Ore Mountains area. In 2006, a person from the Northwest of Germany made headlines because he not only had angels in the "Ore Mountains style" and Räuchermännchen produced in China but also sold these articles cheaply in a store in Seiffen. Apparently, his customers could not determine significant differences between the articles sold by the above named salesman and original products manufactured by craftsmen in Seiffen. This statement though fuels the suspicion that these articles were forbidden counterfeits which were primarily made for unsuspecting customers to mistake them for products which were actually manufactured in the Ore Mountains area.

== Success of protection efforts ==
The above-named salesman was unable to remain permanently active in Seiffen either as a product developer or as a trader; however, he still sells "Ore Mountains style" goods over the internet.

== Gallery ==
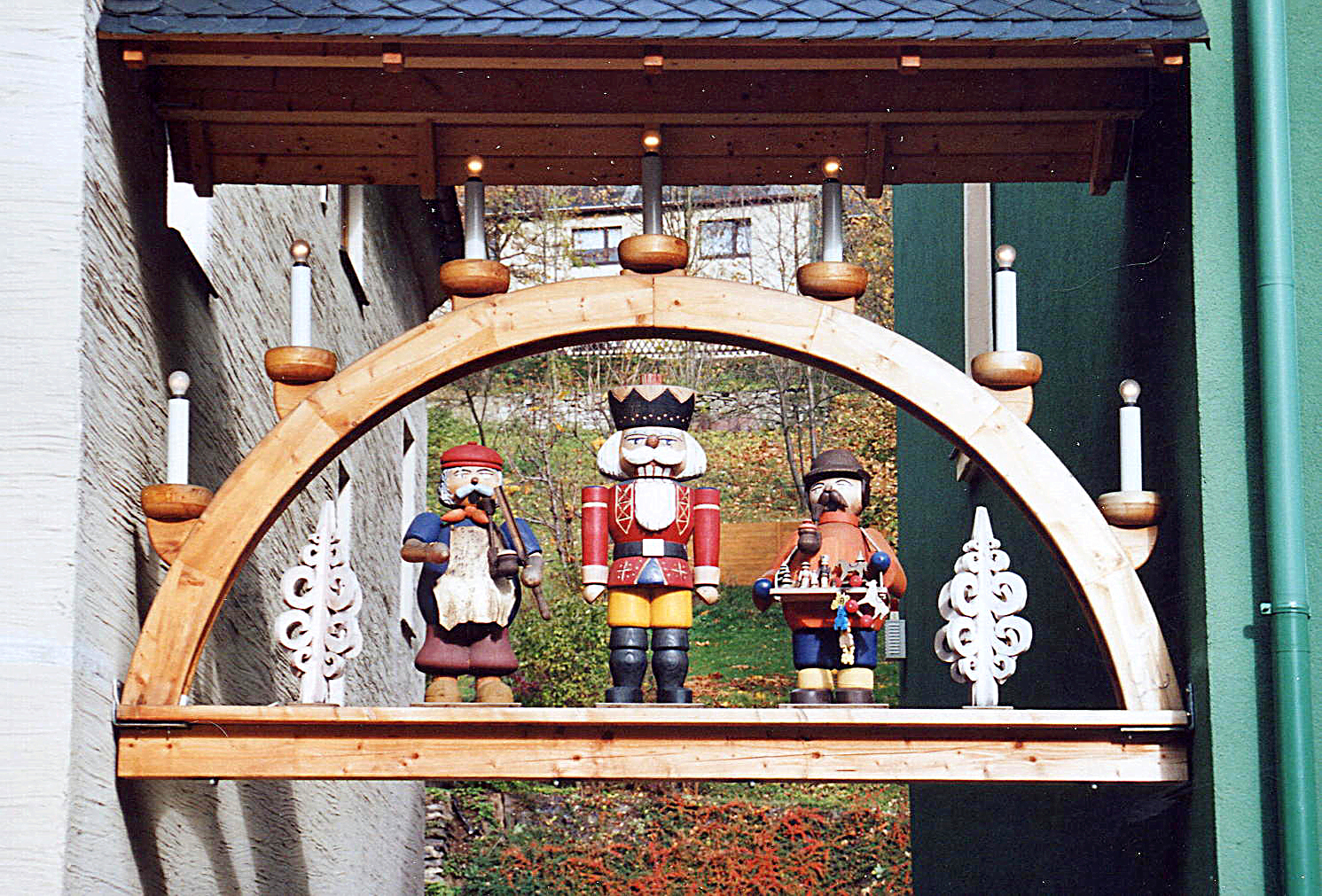
Schwibbogen and nutcracker (centre) and Räuchermänner (left, right) in Seiffen

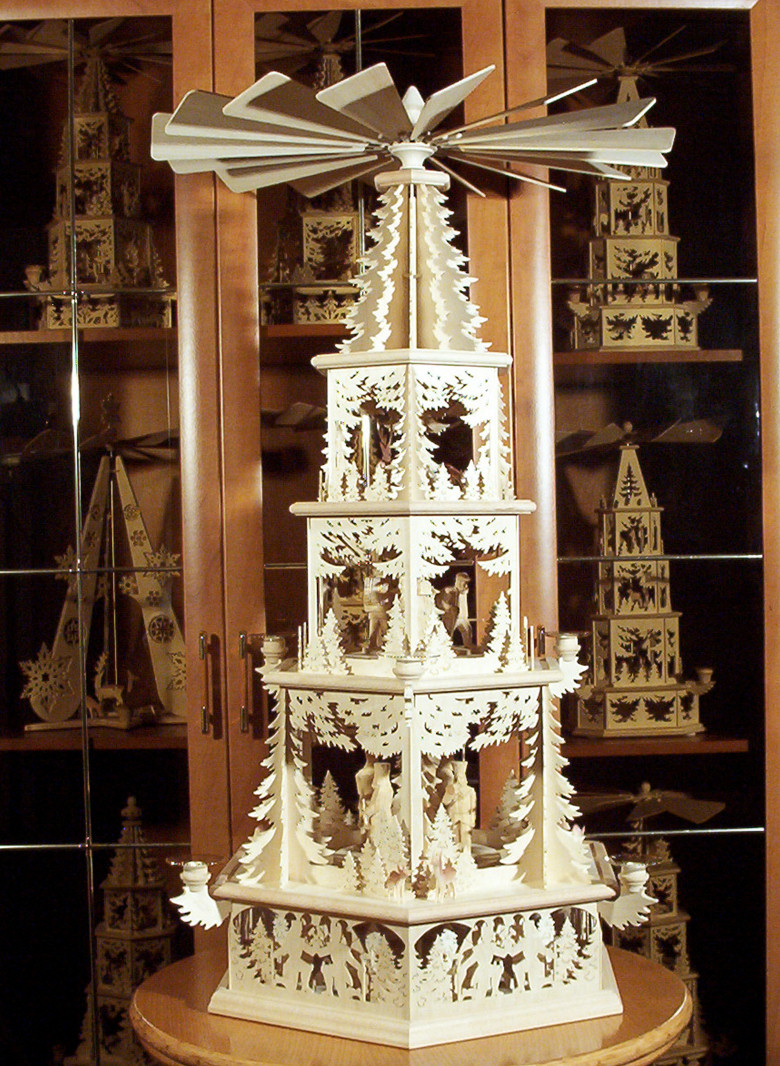
Christmas pyramids from the House of Tilgner

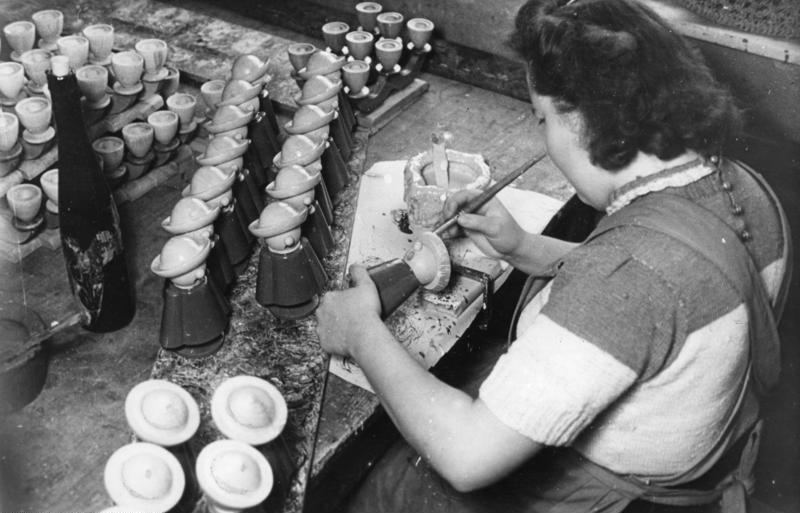
Räuchermänner being painted (Seiffen, 1947)

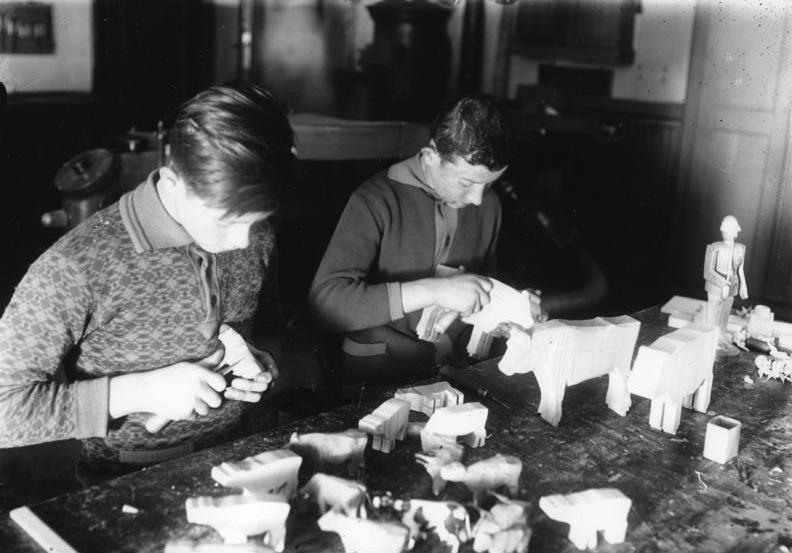
Production of Reifentiere wood-turned animals (Seiffen, 1929)

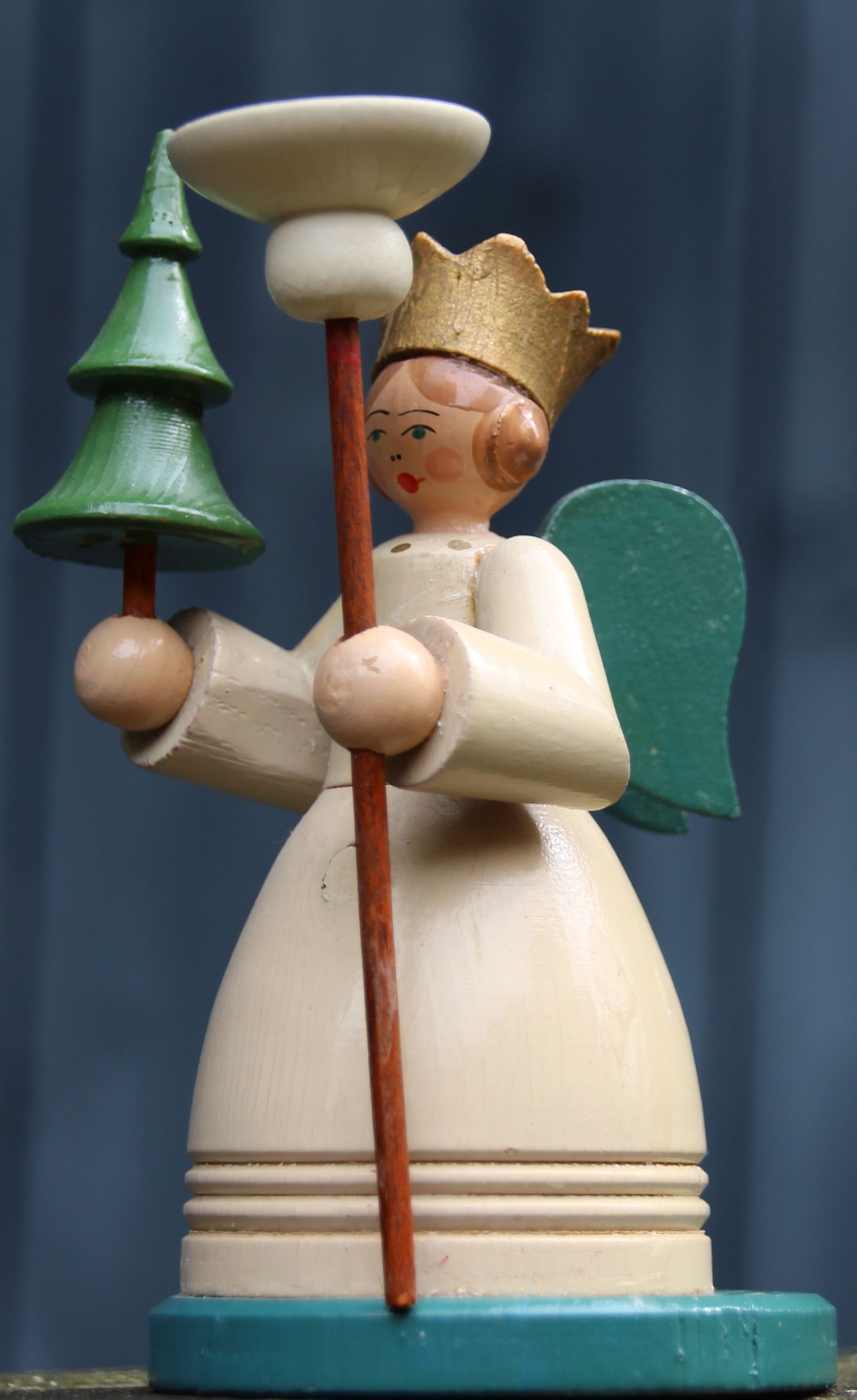
1930th: The born child, called Bornkinnel

== Literature ==
- Manfred Bachmann: Holzspielzeug aus dem Erzgebirge, Verlag der Kunst, Dresden 1984
- Igor A. Jenzen: Das Saturnfest zur Fürstenhochzeit von 1719 und die erzgebirgische Volkskunst. In: Mitteilungen des Landesvereins Sächsischer Heimatschutz e.V. 2 und 3/2019, P. 84–93
- Werner Pflugbeil: Zur geschichtlichen Entwicklung der bergmännischen Holzschnitzerei im Erzgebirge. In: Sächsische Heimatblätter Heft 1/1972, P. 5–11

== See also ==
- Wooden toymaking in the Ore Mountains
