= The Brave Little Toaster Goes to Mars =

1998 American film

- Home video release poster
- Directed by: Robert C. Ramirez
- Screenplay by: Willard Carroll
- Based on: The Brave Little Toaster Goes to Mars by Thomas M. Disch
- Produced by: John Bush; Donald Kushner; Tom Wilhite
- Starring: Deanna Oliver; Timothy Stack; Thurl Ravenscroft; Roger Kabler; Eric Lloyd; Fyvush Finkel; Stephen Tobolowsky; Wayne Knight; Carol Channing; Russi Taylor; Kath Soucie; Alan King; Andy Milder; Chris Young; Jessica Tuck; Brian Doyle-Murray
- Edited by: Julie Lau
- Music by: Alexander Janko; William Finn
- Production companies: Hyperion Pictures; The Kushner-Locke Company
- Distributed by: Buena Vista Home Entertainment (Note: Under Walt Disney Home Video imprint)
- Release date: May 19, 1998 (United States)
- Running time: 73 minutes
- Country: United States
- Language: English

The Brave Little Toaster Goes to Mars is a 1998 American animated direct-to-video musical film based on the 1988 novella of the same name by Thomas M. Disch. It is the sequel to The Brave Little Toaster 2 the Rescue (1997), as well as the third and final installment in The Brave Little Toaster film series. The film was released direct-to-video on May 19, 1998, in the United States by Walt Disney Home Video. In the film, the five appliances of their Master head off on a trip to the red planet Mars after finding out that his infant son was sent there.

It featured the last screen performances of actors DeForest Kelley, Thurl Ravenscroft, and Carol Channing, who died in 1999 (Kelley), 2005 (Ravenscroft), and 2019 (Channing), respectively.

== Plot ==
Rob and Chris have a baby boy named Robbie. At first the appliances all think that they will pay more attention to him but later get used to him. Later, the Hearing Aid, who was left in a drawer in their new house from the past owner gets out of the drawer and passes everyone who is asleep. Toaster then sees him and follows him up to the attic. Toaster gets very suspicious about him when he was talking to someone in space.

The next morning, Toaster reveals what happened last night and they all agree to keep watch of the drawer till he comes out. Later when it is midnight everyone falls asleep, just when Hearing Aid escapes from the drawer. The "little master", as they call Robbie, awakes to the sound and gets out of his crib and follows Hearing Aid. The appliances awaken and find Robbie going up the stairs. Lampy tries to get him down, but he is dragged up the stairs and his plug slips out and he falls down the stairs. The appliances appear in the room when a big beam of light appears. The appliances chase after Hearing Aid, but then Robbie disappears in a bubble through space. After that they all find out that he was sent to Mars.

The appliances contact Wittgenstein the old supercomputer by connecting a computer to a security camera that functions like a phone and request for his help, and he gives them advice. In order to fly to Mars, they get a laundry basket, the ceiling fan, Microwave, and cheddar cheese popcorn (as it is organic) to build a makeshift spacecraft. Wittgenstein also provides Calculator with the data he needs to serve as their navigator. They set off in space to go to Mars and find Robbie. Along the way, they meet a pack of sentient balloons who share their backstories of how they ended up in space before flying away. The appliances crash-land on Mars due to Blanky foolishly turning Microwave off too early and find Robbie. They meet a Christmas angel named Tinselina who was sent to Mars with Viking 1. The appliances follow a group of military toasters who had just arrived to their leader, Supreme Commander, who is a huge refrigerator. They then learn that they are going to blow the Earth up because their old owners threw them out, and Toaster tries to talk them out of it. In between the fight, Robbie is able to push a hand out of his bubble. His hand touches Supreme Commander, and the refrigerator suddenly begins to turn pink. He smiles at the child, before returning his original color.

Toaster ends up in an election with Supreme Commander. After a while Toaster wins the election and is the new Supreme Commander. The appliances go into the freezer of Supreme Commander and find that his true form is another Hearing Aid, who is the brother of Hearing Aid. They have not seen each other in the last sixty years. When asked by Toaster why Supreme Commander changed his mind about blowing up the Earth, he says "the touch of the small boy's hand" reminded him that not all humans are bad. They are all about to return to Earth when suddenly Hearing Aid's brother forgot to deactivate the rocket. The missile counts down. Toaster jumps off with Hearing Aid's brother and destroys the rocket. Toaster is almost left on Mars, but the others come back for him. After Toaster is on board, Tinselina gives up her clothes and hair so they can have something organic to get back to Earth.

The appliances return to Earth just in time as the baby monitor that Ratso, their pet rat, had been restraining all night, finally wakes Rob and Chris up. One day when they are taping Robbie, Tinselina plans to sacrifice herself by going to the trash can, resulting in Rob finding Tinselina in the trash can and fixing her up. As the family celebrates Christmas together, Robbie's first word is "Toaster!" and Tinselina gets to be atop a Christmas tree for the first time.

== Voice cast ==
- Deanna Oliver as Toaster: A brave, optimistic toaster.
- Timothy Stack as Lampy: A neurotic, slightly irascible, yet enthusiastic gooseneck lamp.
- Thurl Ravenscroft as Kirby: A cantankerous but well-meaning vacuum cleaner.
- Roger Kabler as Radio: A wisecracking, pretentious dial A.M. radio alarm clock.
- Eric Lloyd as Blanky: A child-like electric blanket. In the film, he has matured slightly and forms a bond with Robbie.
- Fyvush Finkel as Hearing Aid: An elderly hearing aid who was created by his former owner Albert Einstein. He accidentally beams Robbie onto Mars, triggering the rescue mission. During the adventure, he is reunited with his brother.
- Stephen Tobolowsky as Calculator: A smart, adventurous and melodic pocket-sized calculator. He serves as the coordinator of the rescue.
- Wayne Knight as Microwave: A boastful and offensive but helpful microwave oven who powers the appliance's makeshift aircraft to rescue Robbie. The main characters do not like him because of his arrogance.
- Carol Channing as Fanny: A sardonic and grumpy but helpful overhead ceiling fan. She provides the propulsion of the appliances' makeshift aircraft, using power from Microwave microwaving the popcorn.
- Russi Taylor as Little Master Rob "Robbie" McGroarty: Rob and Chris's baby son. He was beamed into outer space and sent to Mars. He is seemingly aware of the appliances' sentience, going so far as bringing the five main appliances in front of the Christmas tree in the film's ending.
- Kath Soucie as Tinselina: A beautiful Christmas angel ornament living on Mars. Kind, soft-spoken, knowledgeable and sensitive, she becomes the appliances' guide on Mars.
- Alan King as Supreme Commander: The leader of Mars' appliances. Believing that humans are cruel and take advantage of appliances' obsolescence, the Supreme Commander plots to destroy Earth. He first appears as a giant refrigerator, but is later revealed to be Hearing Aid's long-lost twin brother.
  - Jim Cummings provides the singing voice of the Supreme Commander
- Andy Milder as Ratso: Rob and Chris's pet rat who is friends with the appliances. Sarcastic, slightly cantankerous but helpful, he stays on Earth to keep the baby monitor at bay and Rob and Chris unaware of Robbie's disappearance.
- Chris Young as Master Rob McGroarty: The appliances' master, husband of Chris and father of Robbie. Works as a vet in a barn right next to his house.
- Jessica Tuck as Mistress Chris McGroarty: the appliances' mistress, wife of Rob, and mother of Robbie.
- Brian Doyle-Murray as Wittgenstein: A prototype vacuum-tube-based radio supercomputer.
- Farrah Fawcett as Faucet: A motherly automatic faucet on a kitchen sink who lives in Rob and Chris's new home.
- Redmond O'Neal as Squirt: A nozzle sprayer who is Faucet's son.
- Scott Menville as Baby Monitor: A baby monitor.
- DeForest Kelley as Viking 1: The Viking 1 Spacecraft who is among the first Mars denizens to greet the appliances. He serves as a fatherly figure to Tinselina, seeming sad when Tinselina decides to leave Mars to Earth with Toaster and the gang.
- Susie Stevens-Logan as Wild West Balloon
- Marc Allen Lewis as World's Fair Balloon
- Rick Logan as Woodstock Balloon
- Paddi Edwards as Satellite #1
- James Murray as:
  - Satellite #2
  - Iron
- Jeff Robertson as Military Toaster
- Ross Mapletoft as Mixer
- Marc Allen Lewis as Freezer
- Ed Gilbert as Refrigerator

== Music ==
In addition to four original songs, the soundtrack also includes the song "Bread and Butter" by The Newbeats, played at the film's opening. The score was composed by Alexander Janko.

All lyrics are written by Ellen Fitzhugh; all music is composed by William Finn.

No.	Title	Performer(s)	Length
1.	"I See a New You"	Liz Callaway
2.	"Floating"	Rick Logan, Susie Stevens-Logan, Marc Allen Lewis & The Disney Studio Chorus
3.	"Humans"	Jim Cummings, Deanna Oliver, Kath Soucie & The Disney Studio Chorus
4.	"Home Again"	Deanna Oliver

== Reception ==
On Rotten Tomatoes the film has a score of 50% based on reviews from 6 critics.
