= Ore Mountain Toy Museum =

Toy museum in Seiffen, Germany

Coordinates: 50°38′53.5″N 13°26′54.4″E

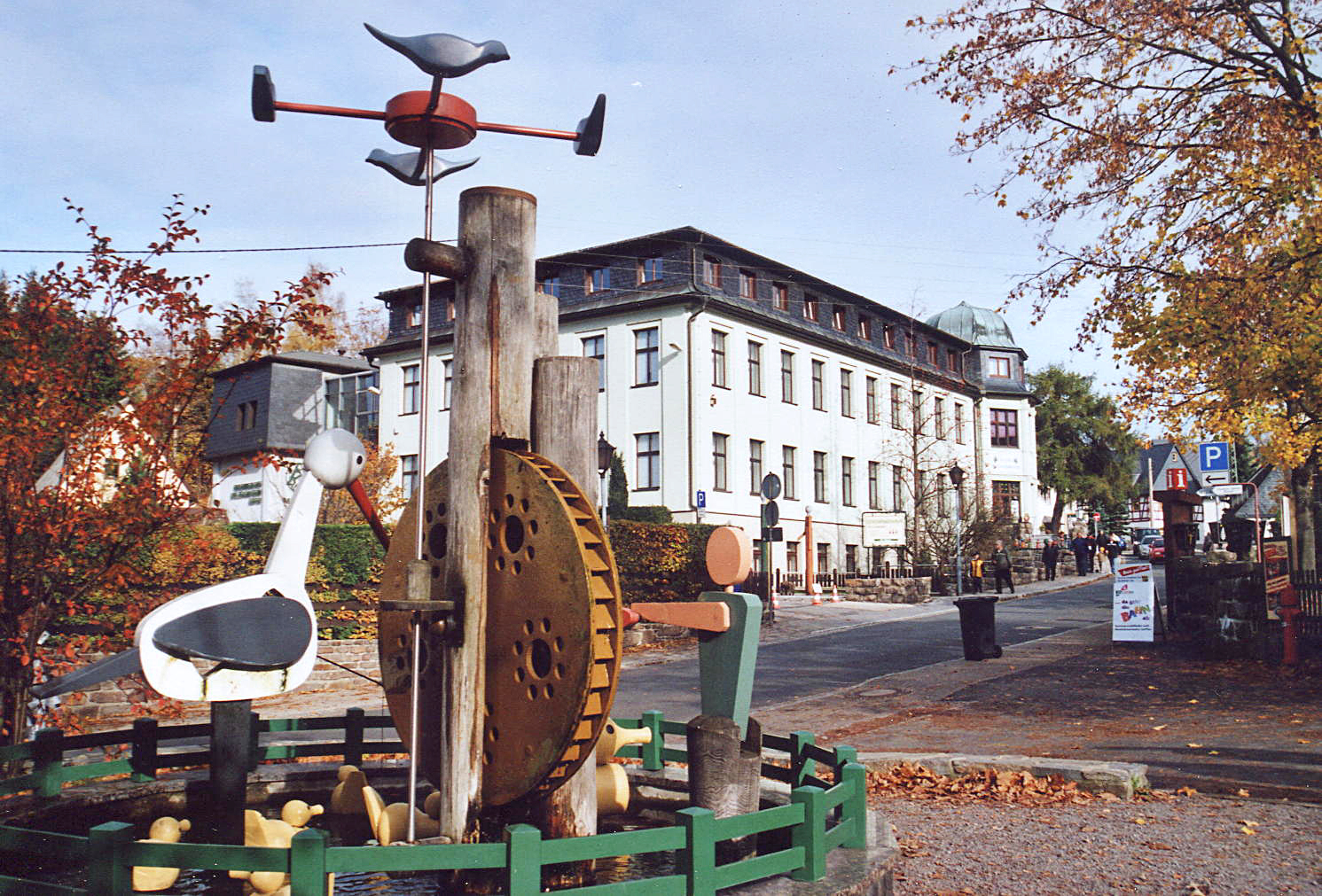
- The Ore Mountain Toy Museum in Seiffen, November 2006
- Established: 1953
- Location: Seiffen, Saxony, Germany

The Ore Mountain Toy Museum in Seiffen (German: Erzgebirgische Spielzeugmuseum Seiffen) is an internationally known museum of Ore Mountain folk art and toys. It was opened in 1953 in Seiffen, Germany. In 1973 it was joined by the Ore Mountains Open-Air Museum (Erzgebirgische Freilichtmuseum), a folk art and local historic museum with 14 houses typical of the Ore Mountains before 1900 on the edge of the toy village.

== History ==
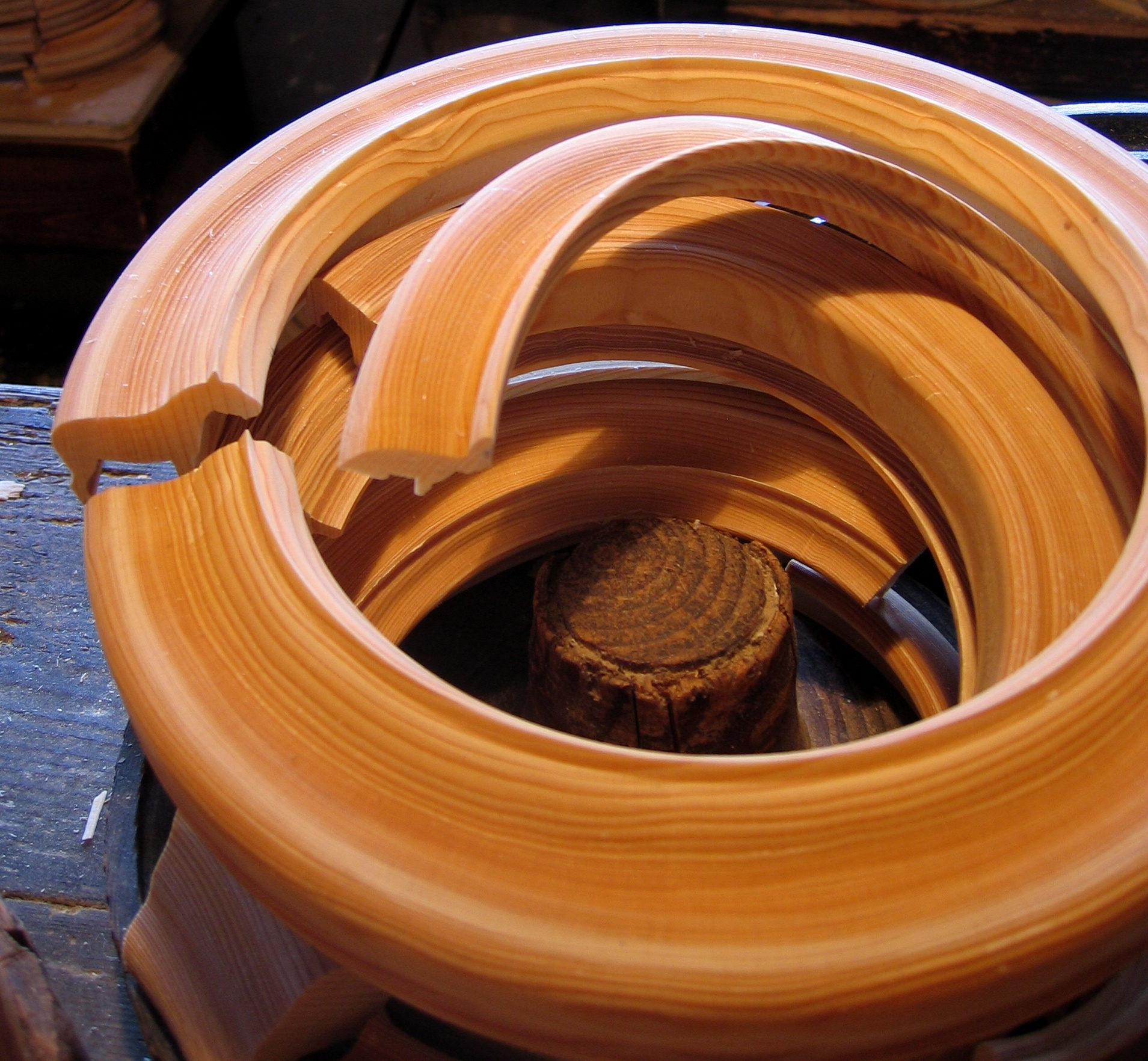
The production of turned animals in the museum (2009)

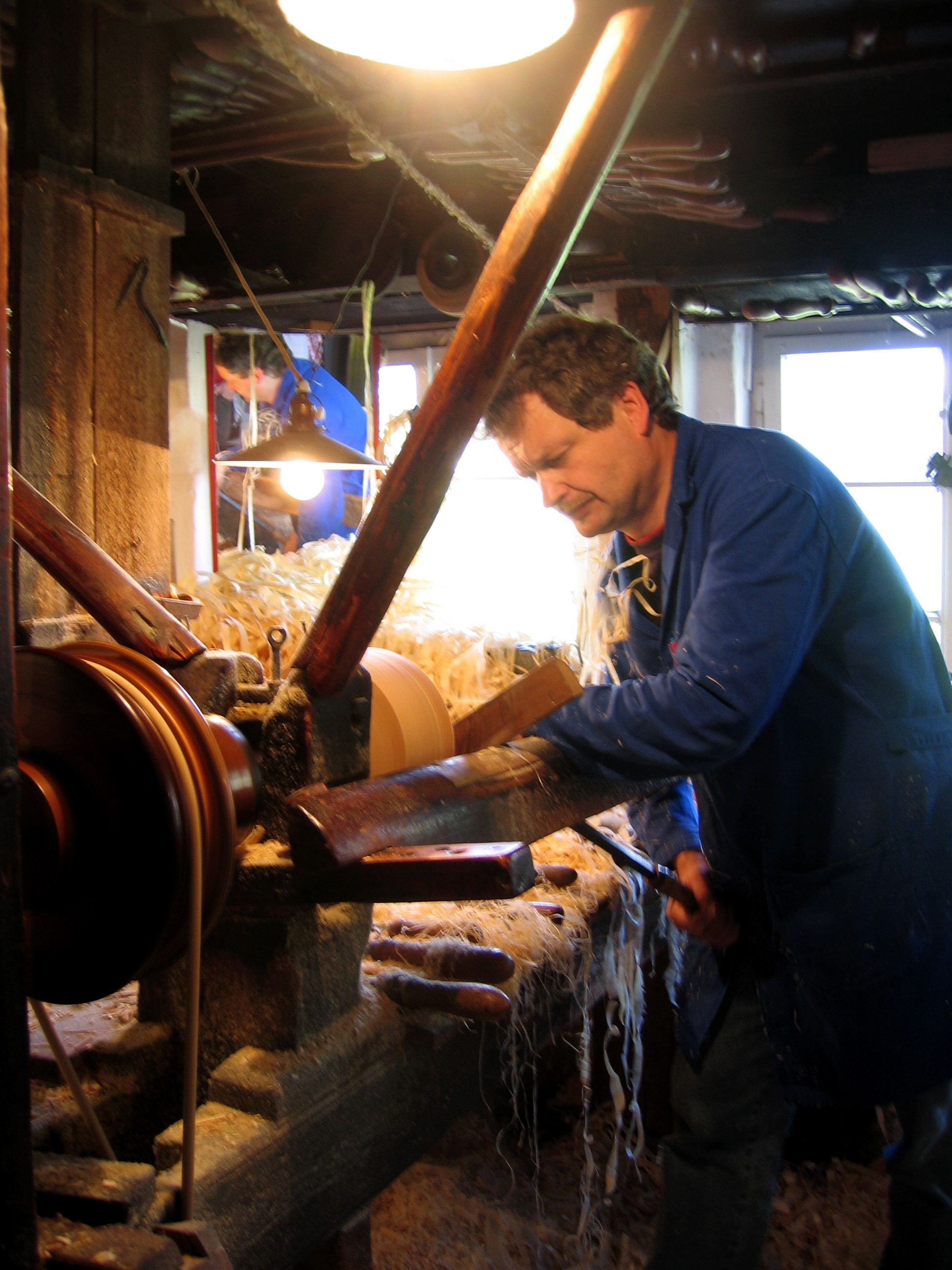
Reifendrehen in the museum in Seiffen (2009)

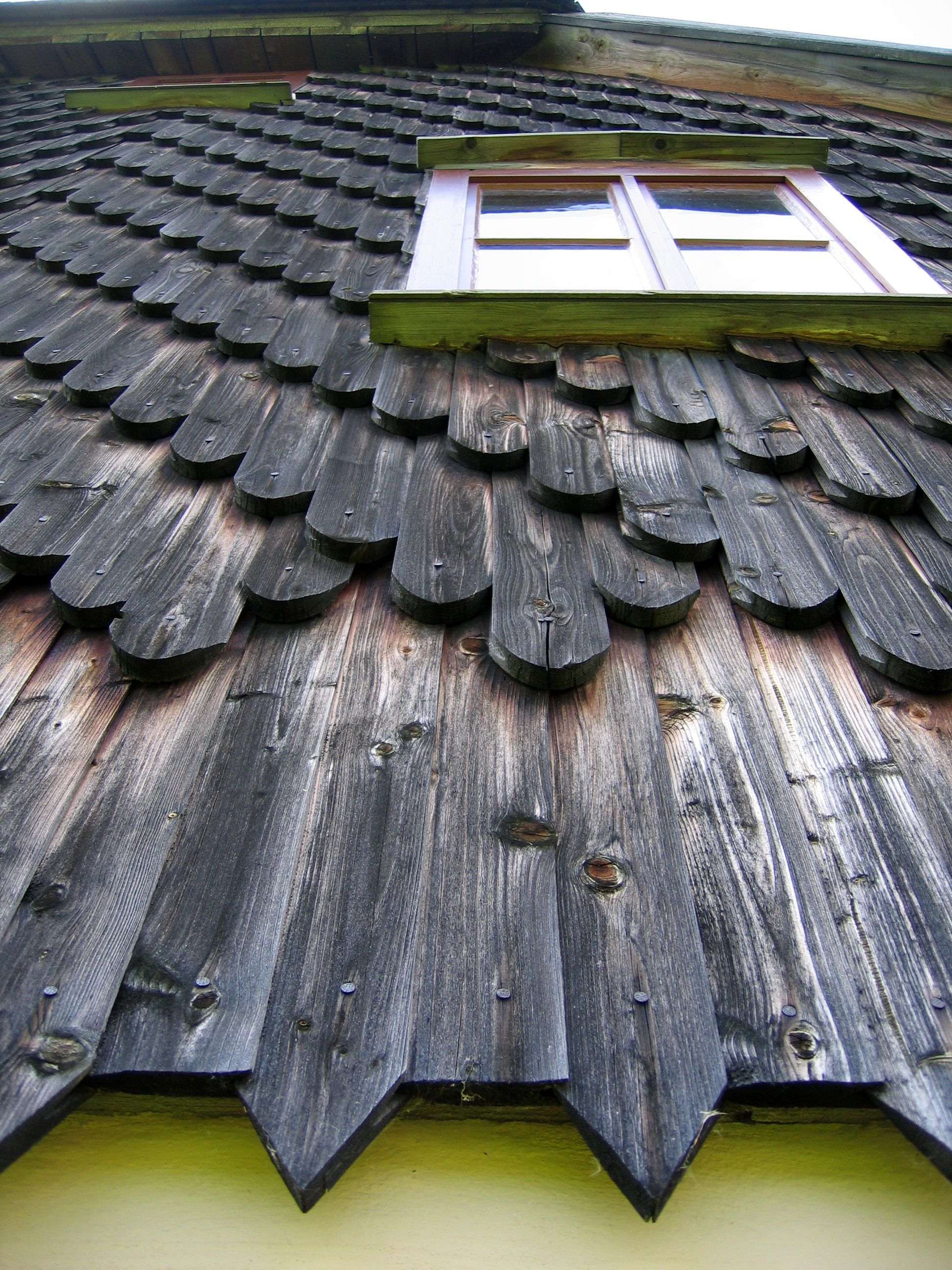
Wooden shingles on one of the 14 rebuilt houses in the open-air museum, July 2009

The museum originated with the Seiffen Wooden Toy and Merchandise Exhibition (Holzspielwaren- und Holzwaren-Ausstellung Seiffen) that took place from 9 July to 3 August 1914 in the Albert Salon. For an entry fee of 50 pfennigs – 25 pfennigs for children – visitors were fascinated, for example, by a Noah's Ark with 300 animals, chess pieces, products of the reifendrehen woodturning craft that was only carried out in Seiffen at the time by a compulsory guild (Zwangsinnung), as well as larger animal figures, that were cut out of posts. On show were products of Runddreherei, a form of woodturning and ornate carvings, as well as straw-covered objects, which were actually not part of the business, but were made at the request of the leader.

The exhibition was organised by a priest, Hermann Härtel (b 30 September 1864 in Lichtenstein; d 7 August 1919 in Seiffen/Sa.) together with the district trade association which he had been chairman of for many years. Härtel enhanced the exhibition with a part of his parish collection.

In a room that had been furnished in the manner of an old Ore Mountain parlour were displayed a painted four-poster bed (1764), a huge chest (1734), a chest with a lid painted on the inside (1785), a colourful wardrobe covered with flowers (1798), a giant farmer's table with a tabletop of valuable wood, stone items, guild tankards, glasses and other household items. On the table stood a might clay pitcher (1739), a tin lamp (Gockel-Lampe) and an open family bible. The whole was completed by a wood-shaving candlestick (Spanleuchter) with wooden shavings. After a tour visitors could buy a "miniature farmhouse room with a stove in a matchbox" at the counter.

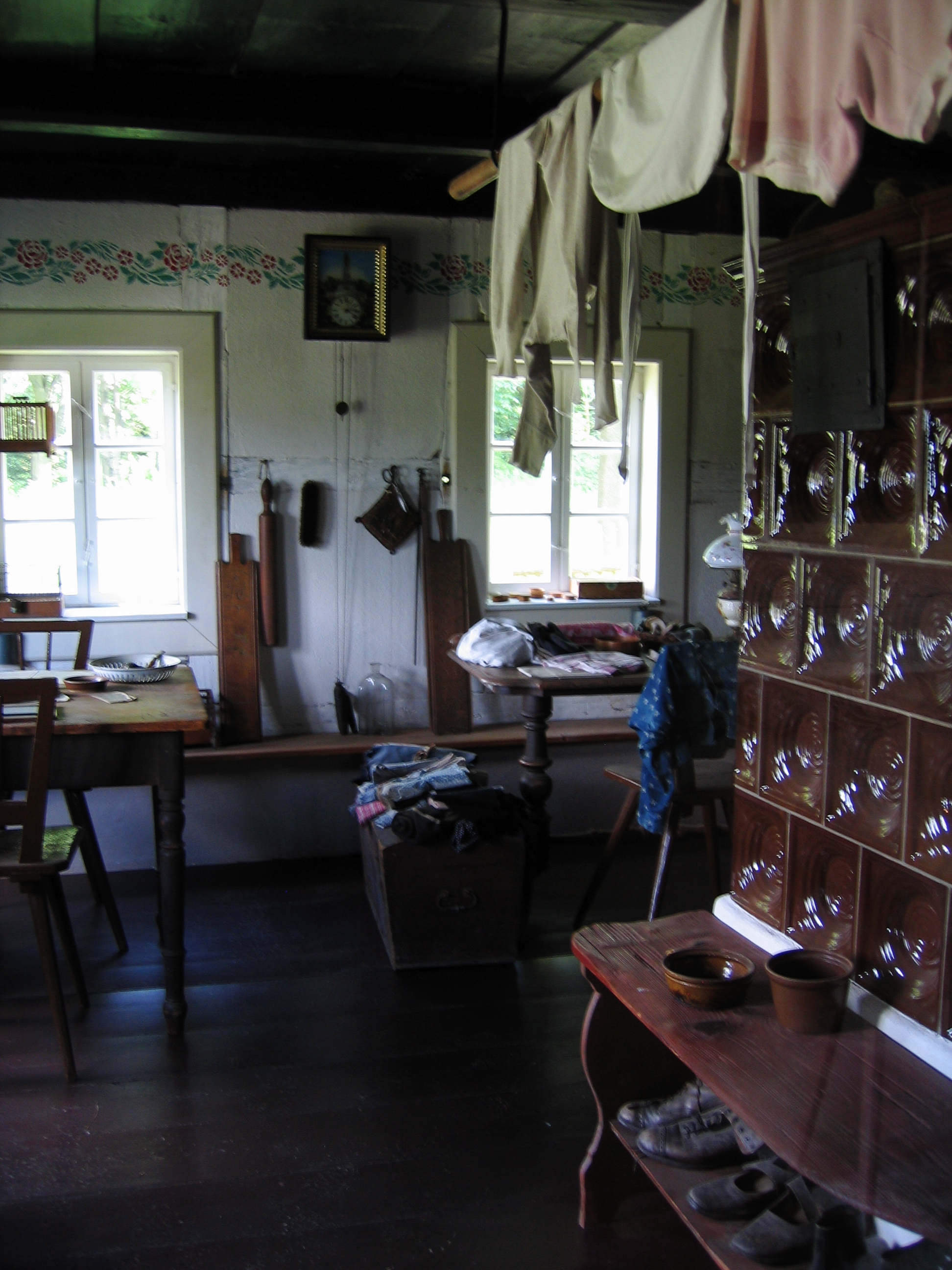
An Ore Mountain Hutzenstube in the museum, July 2009

On 5 December 1920, the newly created toy museum was opened in the State Trade Training School (Staatliche Fachgewerbeschule). The collection of "Older and Newer Playthings" acquired since 1914 by its founder, Oberstudienrat Professor Alwin Seifert (1873–1937) was enhanced by the Härtel Collection. For the 1944 trade show a farmhouse parlour was put together, along with a cocklestove (Kachelofen) and a fireside bench. A candelabra that hung over the table (made by Louis Strauß and restored today) gave the parlour the usual Christmas time decoration. Neither were Christmas angels, miners, nutcrackers or Räuchermännel missing. The exhibition also included interesting old and new toys and demonstration lessons from the training school. At that time it was the only toy museum in Saxony.

At the beginning of the 1930s there were attempts in the Seiffen region to create a central industrial exhibition. The then-State Toy School took over the design and displays of the Seiffen Toy Show (Spielzeug-Werbeschau Seiffen) opened in 1936.

On 5 July 1953, the house was opened again as the Local History and Toy Museum (Heimat- und Spielzeugmuseum) and finally renamed into the Ore Mountain Toy Museum, Seiffen (Erzgebirgisches Spielzeugmuseum Seiffen). The first visitor to the museum was Rudolf Mauersberger, whose Dresdner Kreuzchor choir had sung that evening in the Seiffen Pinge (a depression caused by mining subsidence in which there is today an open-air theatre). In 1999 the toy museum underwent extensive rebuilding and extension. Today, on three storeys, there are around 5,000 exhibits as well as a great deal of background information.

== See also ==
- List of open-air museums in Germany
- Wooden toymaking in the Ore Mountains

== Sources ==
- Johannes Eichhorn: Zur Geschichte des Erzgebirgischen Spielzeugmuseums Seiffen. in: Erzgebirgische Heimatblätter. Heft 6/1993. p. 12-17.
