= Reifendrehen =

Reifendrehen is a unique type of toy manufacture using wood turning techniques that was developed in the Ore Mountains in the vicinity of the town of Seiffen in Germany and continues there to the present day. The process produces small animals and other figures or even little wooden houses in outline, that are used as toys or to decorate Christmas pyramids or Nativity scenes. The animals and figures (Reifentiere and Reifenfiguren) so produced are an inherent part of Ore Mountain folk art.

== Production ==
In the process known as Reifendrehen (literally "tyre turning" or “hoop turning”) a suitable piece of wood, as far as possible free of splits, is worked on a special wood lathe to produce a wooden ring with a diameter of about 30 to 50 centimetres, the cross-section of which forms the outline of the desired figure. Small slices are then sawn or split off the ring with a sharp knife. These are used as the raw material from which the finished figures are made by carving and painting.

The technique of Reifendrehen, which demands great experience and skill, emerged around 1800. It enabled, during the 19th century, the efficient mass production of wooden figures, because it was faster and cheaper than pure woodcarving by hand. Today part of the exhibition at the Ore Mountain Toy Museum in Seiffen is dedicated to the craft of the turners - the Reifendreher - who make these toys. In addition, there are several visitor workshops in the region around Seiffen.

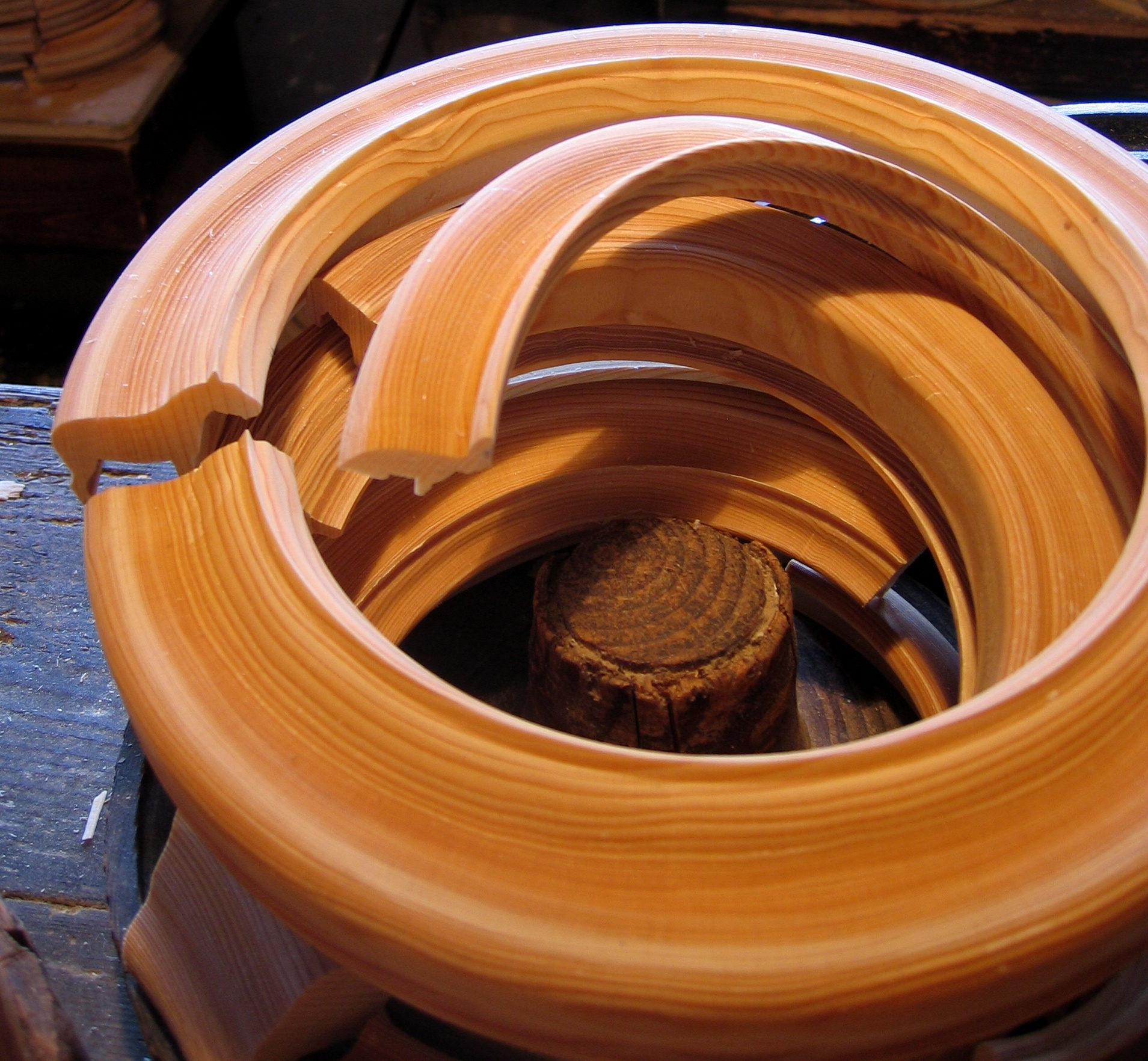
The production of Reifendrehen animals in the Ore Mountain Open Air Museum, July 2009

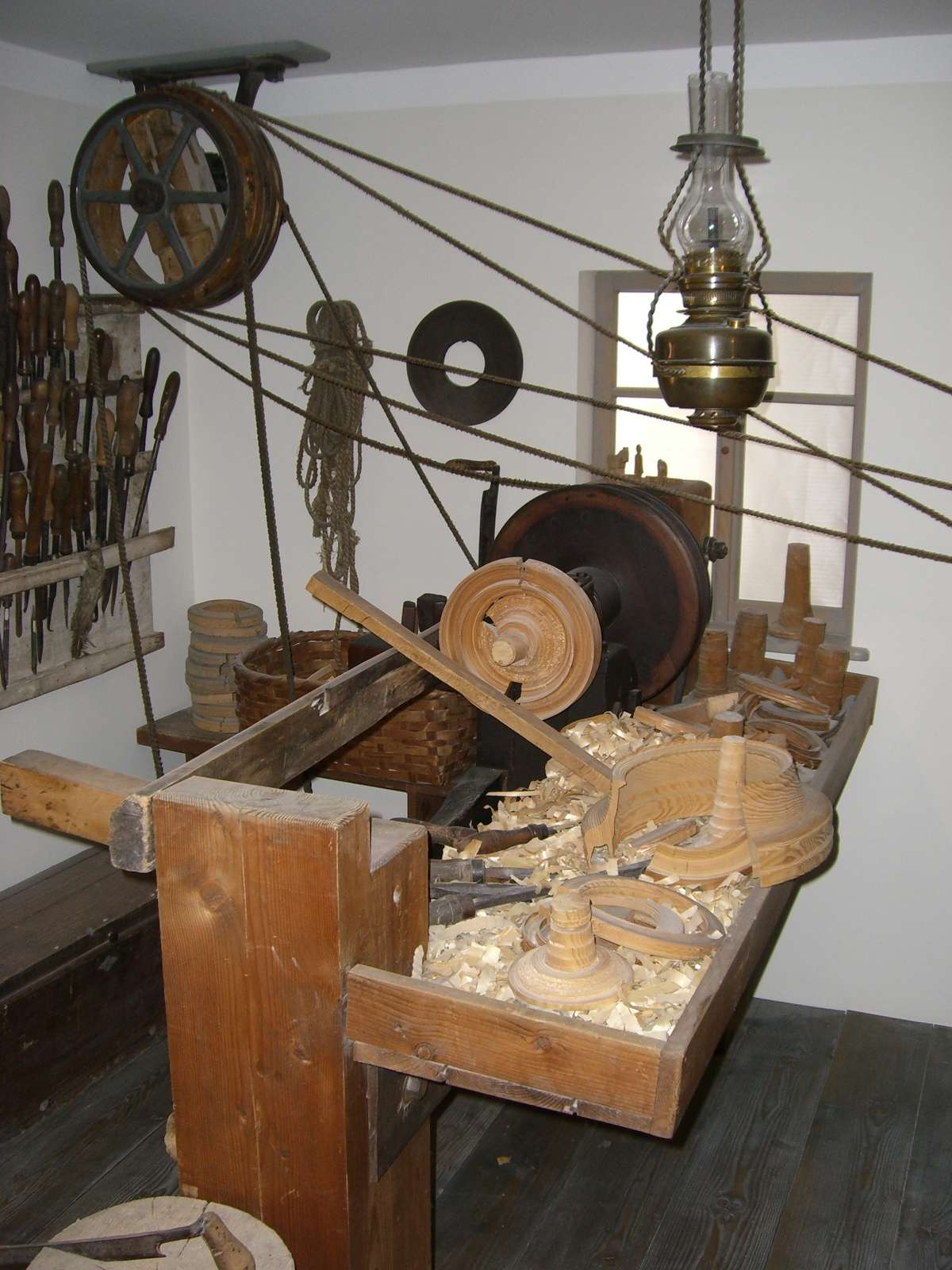
Reifendrehen workshop

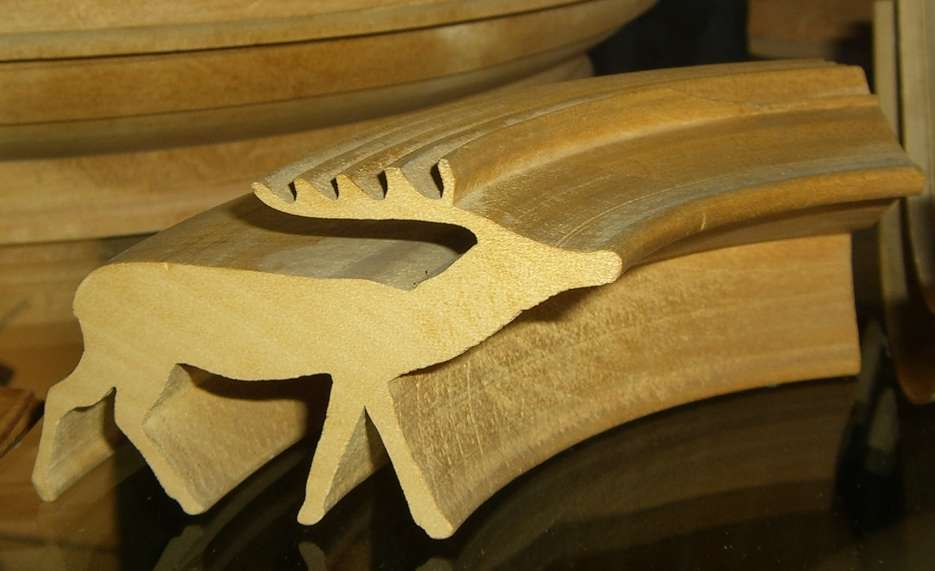
A turned wooden ring in the shape of a deer

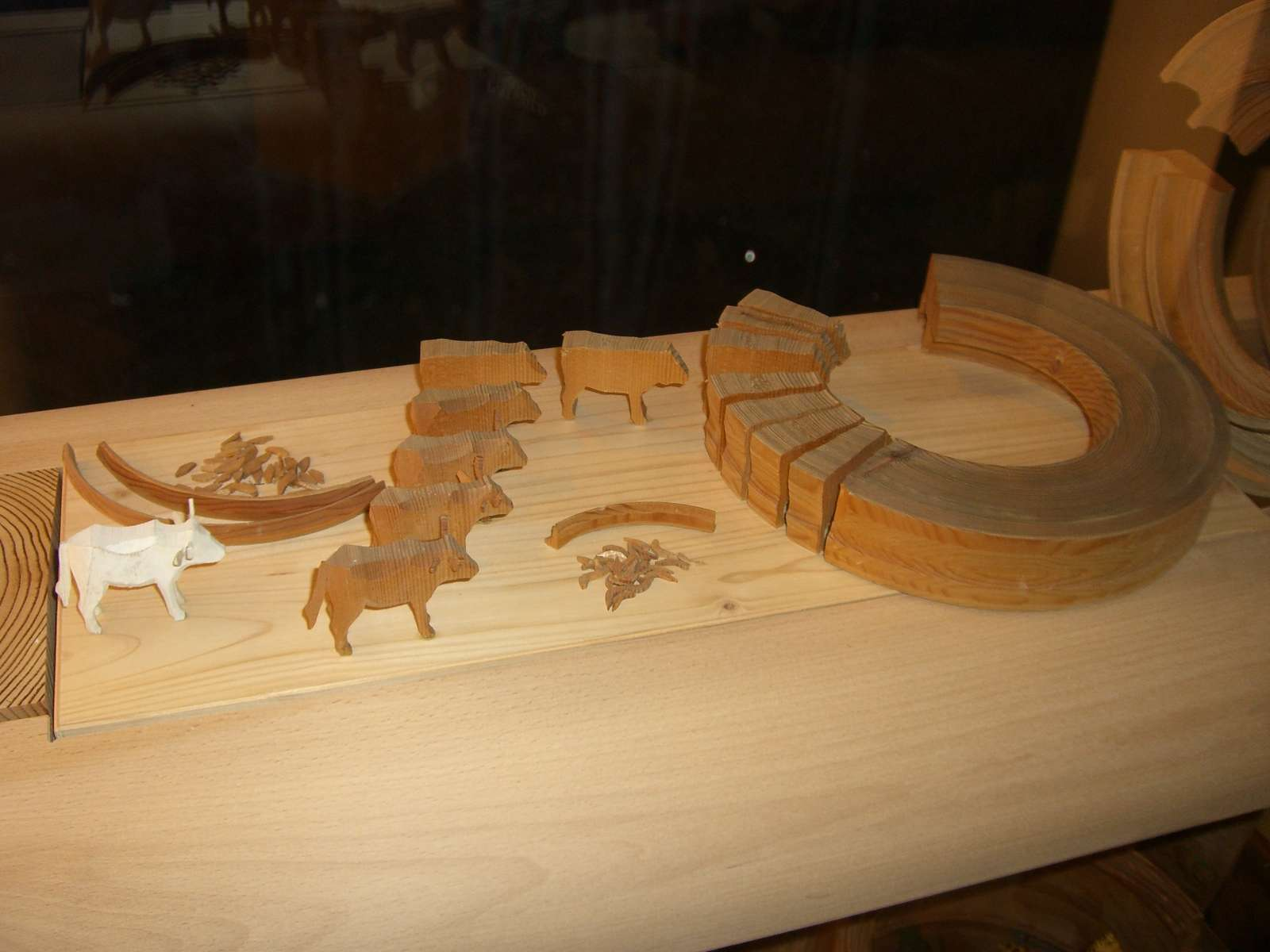
Finishing touches

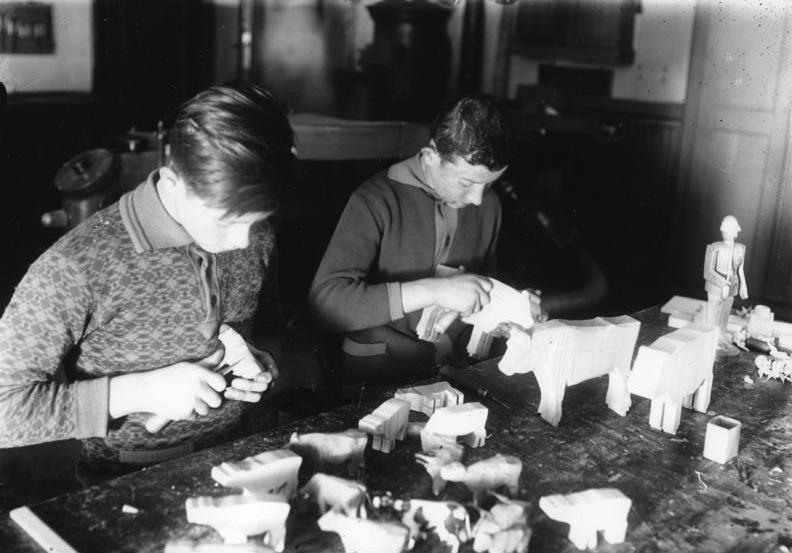
Production of turned animals (Seiffen, 1929)

== See also ==
- Wooden toymaking in the Ore Mountains

== Sources ==
- Hellmut Bilz: Seiffener Reifentiere. Herstellung, Gestaltung und Bedeutung. Series by the Ore Mountain Toy Museum, Seiffen 1987
- Hellmut Bilz: Das Reifendreherhandwerk im Spielwarengebiet Seiffen. Series by the Ore Mountain Toy Museum, Seiffen 1989
