= Schwibbogen =

Christmas lamp arch from the Ore Mountains

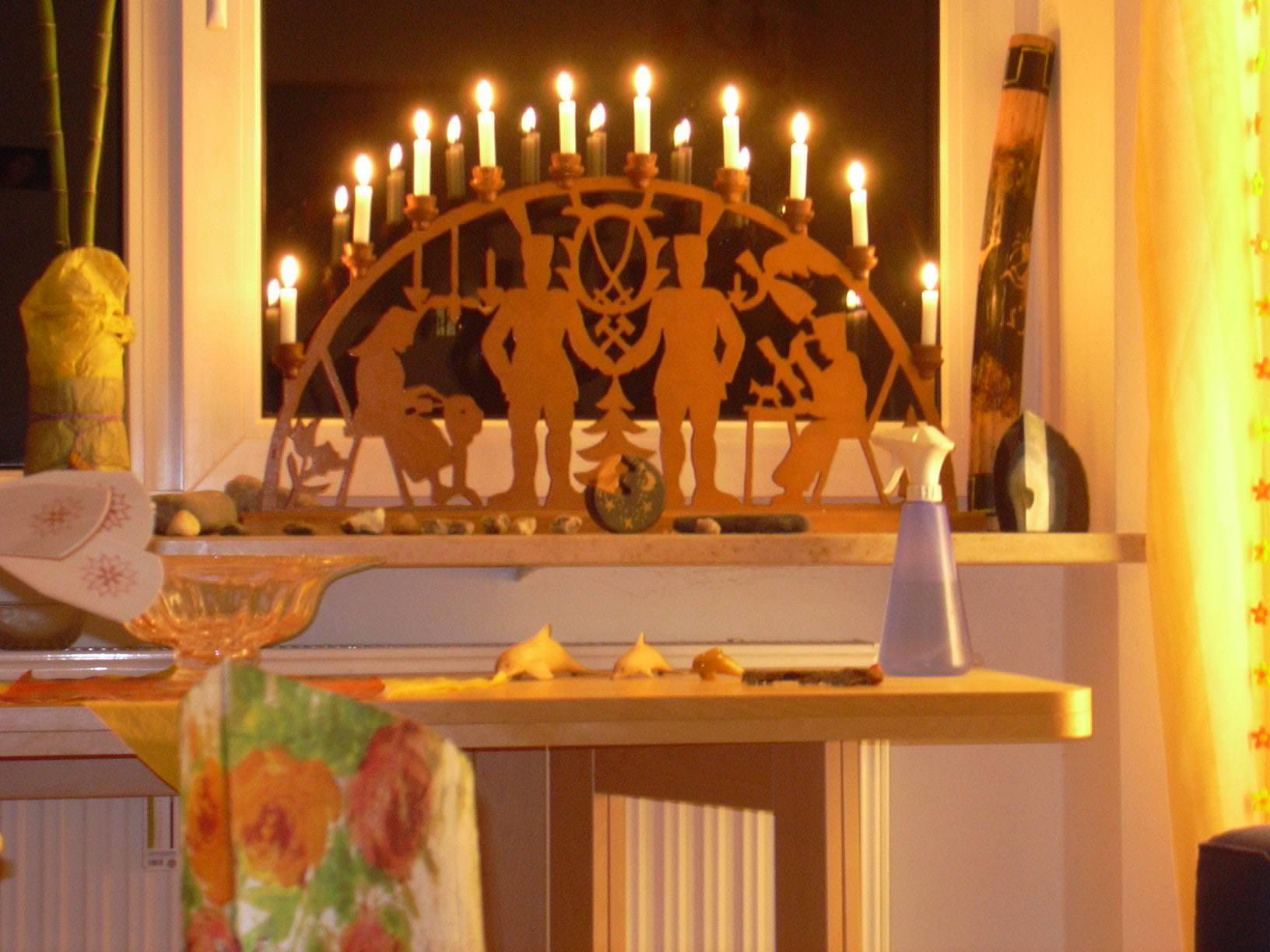
A typical schwibbogen

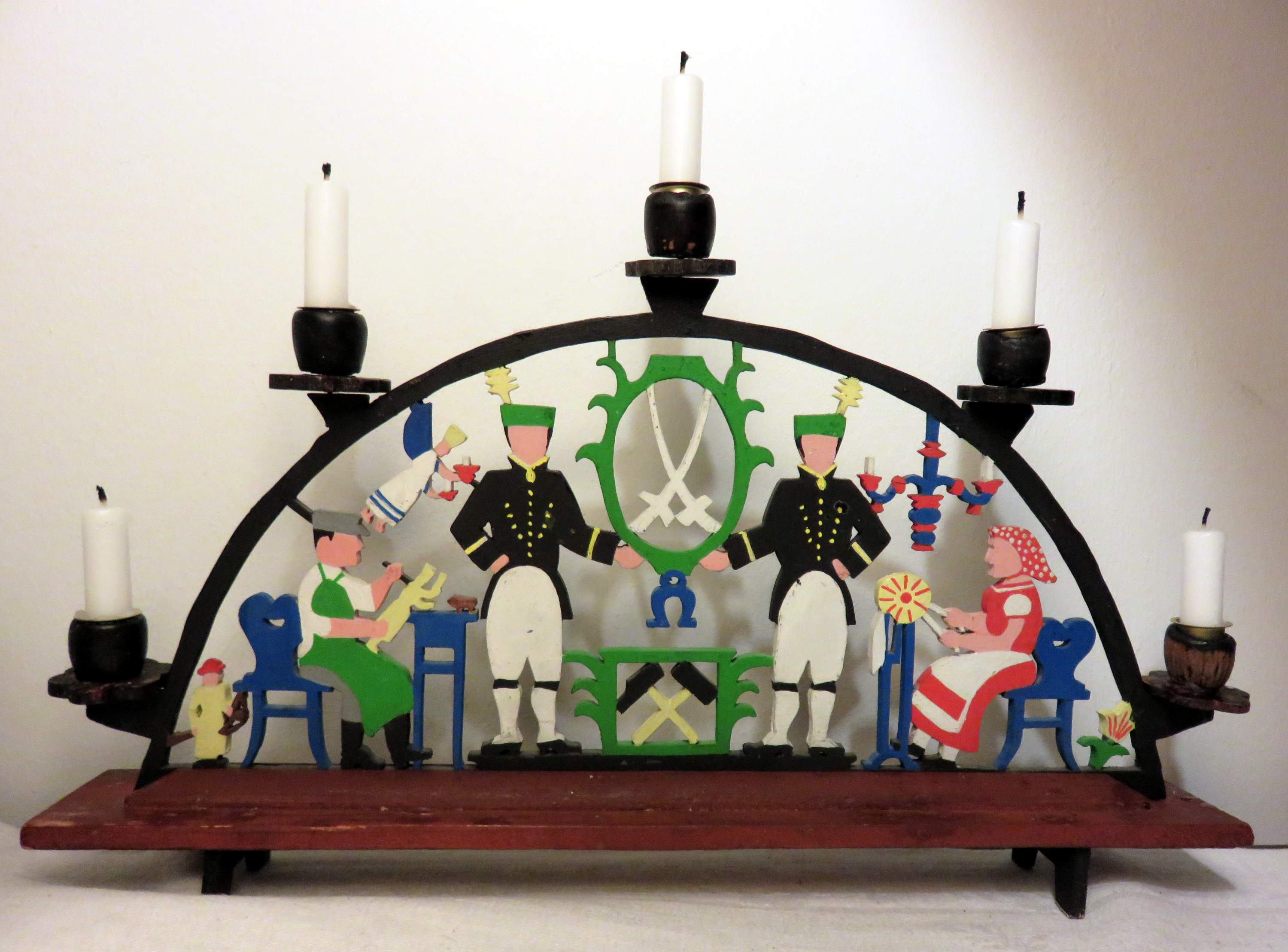
Bunter Erzgebirgischer Schwibbogen1

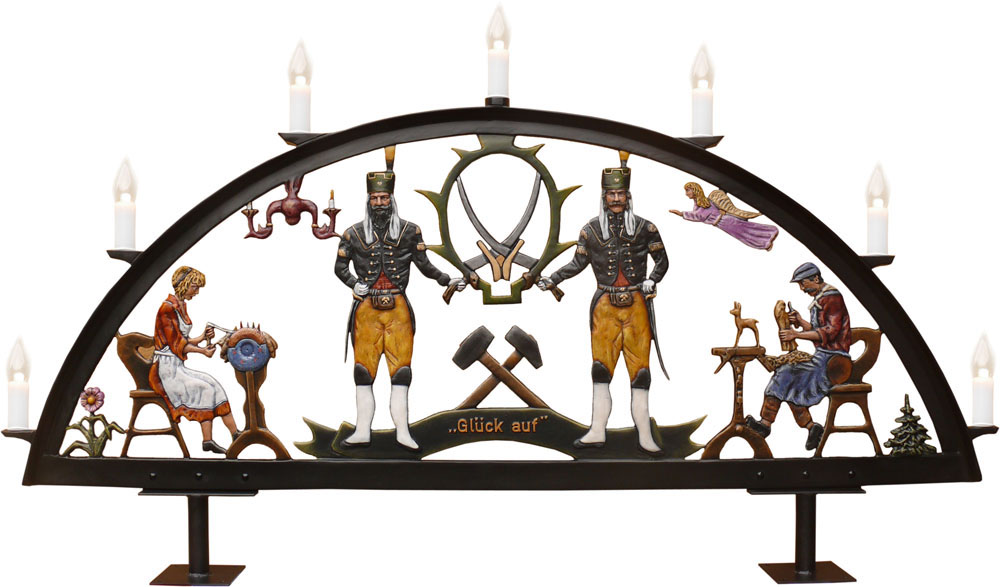
Lichterbogen Kunstguss Döhler

A Schwibbogen (German: [ˈʃvɪpˌboːɡn̩]) is a decorative candle-holder from the Ore Mountains region of Saxony, Germany. The first metal schwibbogen was made in 1740 in Johanngeorgenstadt. The early candle arches consisted of a single forged piece of black metal which could be painted. The number of candles varies with the size of the arc, the original design holding eleven. In the UK candle arches or candle bridges are marketed, often just consisting of a simple wooden stepped arch with 7 electric candles. These are not strictly schwibbögen.

== Background ==
The name Schwibbogen (German pronunciation: [ʃʋəb'boːɡən]) is from the Middle High German swiboge, "to hover". The development of the schwibbogen arch is closely related to the mining traditions of the Ore Mountains. It most likely developed as a candle holder made from metal for the Christmas shift (Mettenschicht), a common dinner celebrated by miners, the mining foreman (Steiger) and the smith who had been responsible for the mining tools throughout the year. It bears symbols commonly associated with the life and wishes of the miners.

The most famous design was created b in 1937 for a show in Schwarzenberg. It depicted the three main sources of income of the people in the region in the 18th and 19th century. Thus the schwibbogen showed apart from some traditional symbols; two miners, a wood carver, a bobbin lace maker, a Christmas Tree, two miner's hammers, two crossed swords, and an angel. It holds seven candles. Contrary to popular belief the candle holder was always associated with Christmas. The light symbolizes the longing of the miners who didn't see the daylight in winter for weeks sometimes due to their long working hours below the surface. During the Christmas shift, the lights may also have represented the safety lamps of all the comrades from the mining team who had completed the year of dangerous work in the mine.

Over time the designs changed. After World War II the schwibbogen has reached not only a new popularity, but had changed a lot in its looks. Modern designs are typically made out of wood, and depict historical or religious scenes. Other designs include landscapes, skylines and advertisements, retaining some link to Christmas traditions

Especially in the Ore Mountains the windows of the houses in villages and towns feature a lit candle arch—usually with the traditional designs or at least local scenes. The town of Seiffen is particularly noted for its production of schwibbogen in its craft shops.

== See also ==
- Wooden toymaking in the Ore Mountains
