= Nutcracker =

Mechanical device for cracking nuts

Using a nutcracker

A nutcracker is a tool designed to open nuts by cracking their shells. There are many designs, including levers, screws, and ratchets. The lever version is also used for cracking lobster and crab shells.

A decorative version, a nutcracker doll, portrays a person whose mouth forms the jaws of the nutcracker.

== Functions ==
Nuts were historically opened using a hammer and anvil, often made of stone. Some nuts such as walnuts can also be opened by hand, by holding the nut in the palm of the hand and applying pressure with the other palm or thumb, or using another nut.

Manufacturers produce modern functional nutcrackers usually somewhat resembling pliers, but with the pivot point at the end beyond the nut, rather than in the middle. These are also used for cracking the shells of crab and lobster to make the meat inside available for eating. Hinged lever nutcrackers, often called a "pair of nutcrackers", may date back to Ancient Greece. By the 14th century in Europe, nutcrackers were documented in England, including in the Canterbury Tales, and in France. The lever design may derive from blacksmiths' pincers. Materials included metals such as silver, cast-iron and bronze, and wood including boxwood, especially those from France and Italy. More rarely, porcelain was used. Many of the wooden carved nutcrackers were in the form of people and animals.

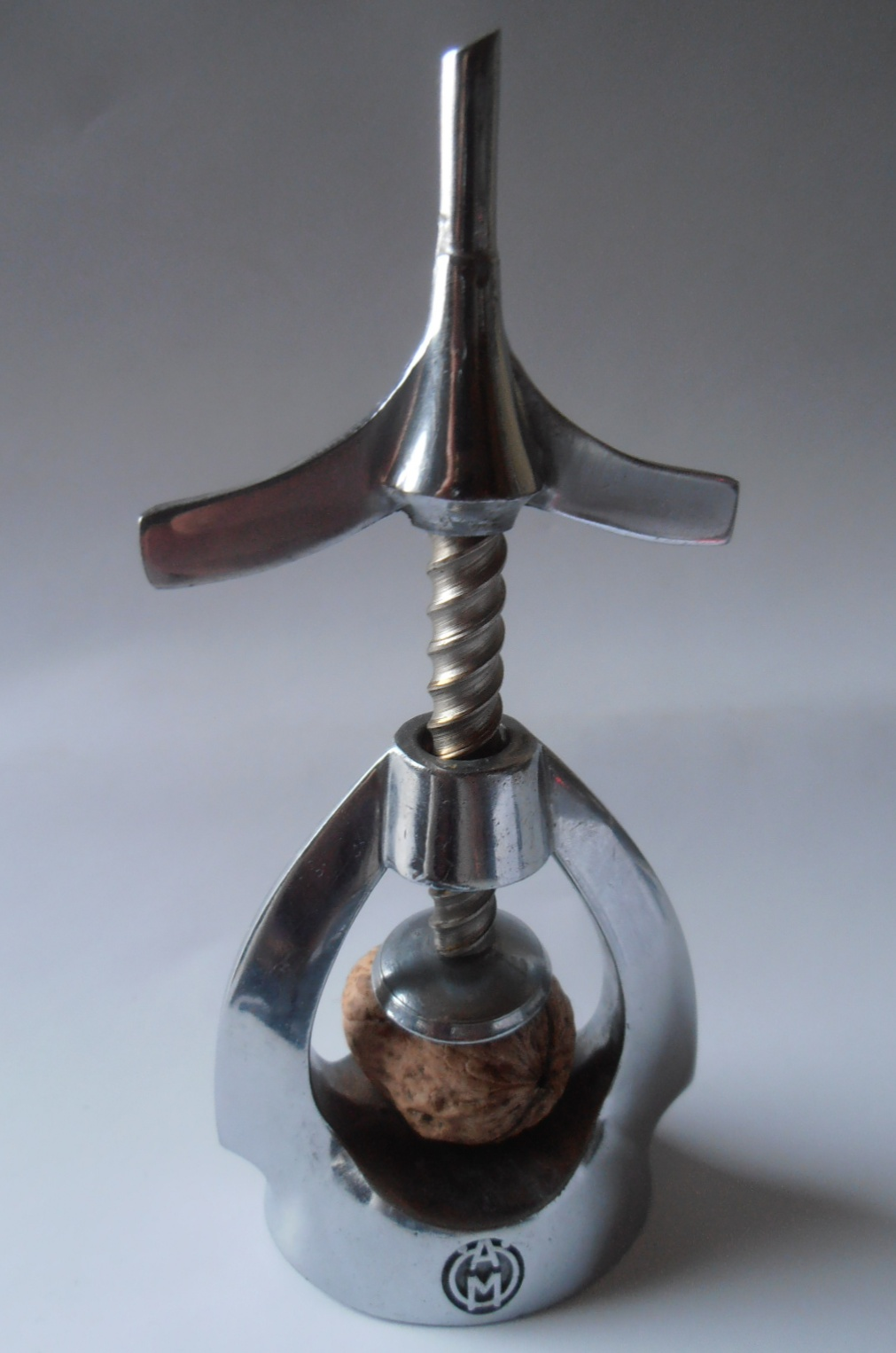
A screw nutcracker

During the Victorian era, fruit and nuts were presented at dinner and ornate and often silver-plated nutcrackers were produced to accompany them on the dinner table. Nuts have long been a popular choice for desserts, particularly throughout Europe. The nutcrackers were placed on dining tables to serve as a fun and entertaining center of conversation while diners awaited their final course. At one time, nutcrackers were actually made of metals such as brass, and it was not until the 1800s in Germany that the popularity of wooden ones began to spread.

The late 19th century saw two shifts in nutcracker production: the rise in figurative and decorative designs, particularly from the Alps where they were sold as souvenirs, and a switch to industrial manufacture, including availability in mail-order catalogues, rather than artisan production. After the 1960s, the availability of pre-shelled nuts led to a decline in ownership of nutcrackers and a fall in the tradition of nuts being put in children's Christmas stockings.

=== Alternative designs ===
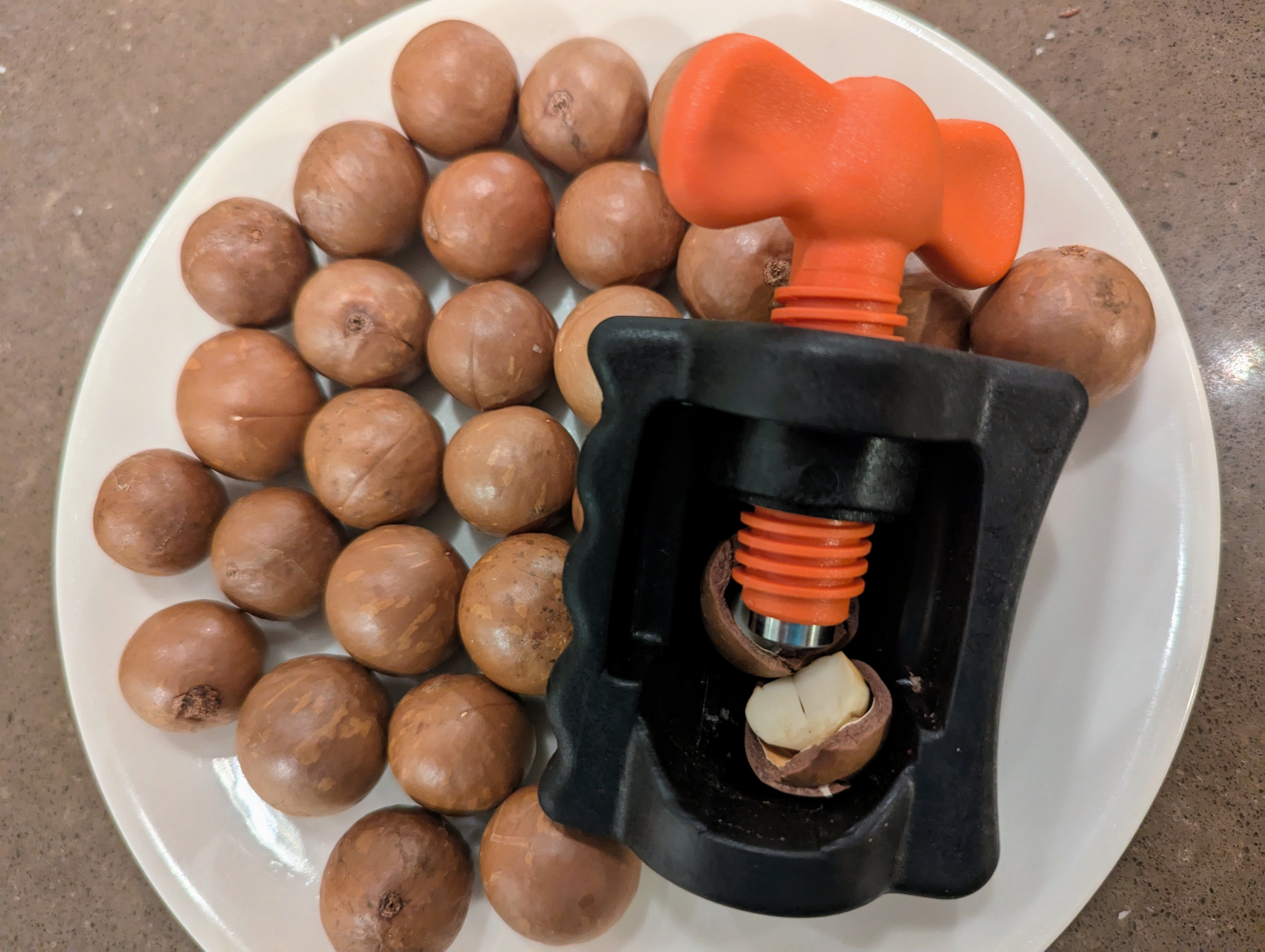
Modern screw nutcracker designed specifically for macadamia nuts

In the 17th century, screw nutcrackers were introduced that applied more gradual pressure to the shell, some like a vise. The spring-jointed nutcracker was patented by Henry Quackenbush in 1913. A ratchet design, similar to a car jack, that gradually increases pressure on the shell to avoid damaging the kernel inside is used by the Crackerjack, patented in 1947 by Cuthbert Leslie Rimes of Morley, Leeds and exhibited at the Festival of Britain. Unshelled nuts are still popular in China, where a key device is inserted into the crack in walnuts, pecans, and macadamias and twisted to open the shell.

Screw nutcrackers are still commonly used to crack macadamia nuts, since their shell is too hard to be cracked with an ordinary nutcracker.

== For crustaceans ==
A crab cracker (also known as a lobster cracker or crab claw cracker) is a specialized food utensil, similar in construction (and sometimes appearance) to certain types of nutcrackers, used to crack the hard shells of crabs and lobsters by pulling the two handles together to access the flesh inside, while preparing or eating them.

== Decorative ==
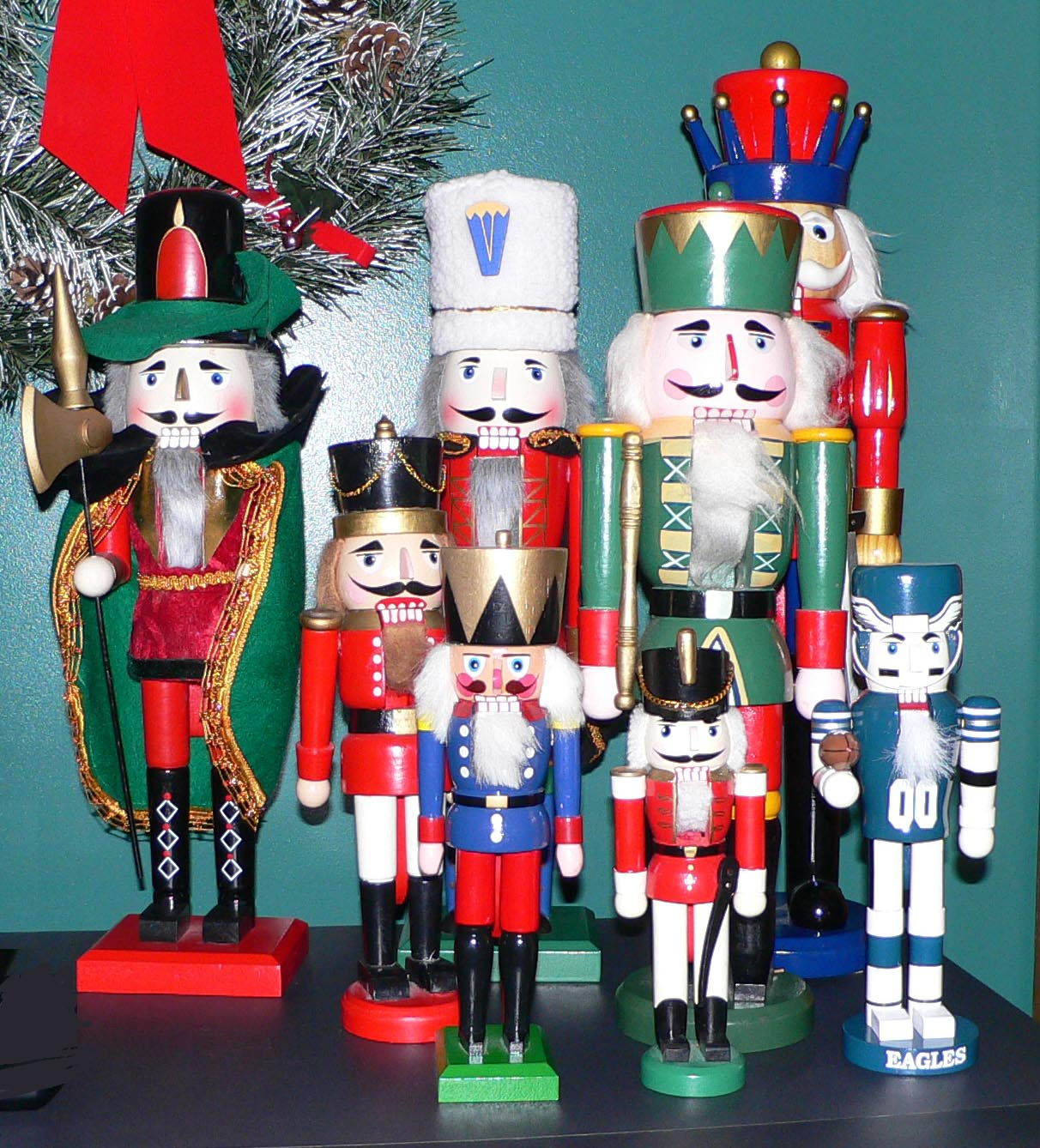
A variety of figure nutcrackers

Nutcrackers in the form of wood carvings of a soldier, knight, king, or other profession have existed since at least the 15th century. Figurative nutcrackers are a good luck symbol in Germany, and a folktale recounts that a puppet-maker won a nutcracking challenge by creating a doll with a mouth for a lever to crack the nuts. These nutcrackers portray a person with a large mouth which the operator opens by lifting a lever in the back of the figurine. Originally one could insert a nut in the big-toothed mouth, press down and thereby crack the nut. Modern nutcrackers in this style serve mostly for decoration, mainly at Christmas time, a season of which they have long been a traditional symbol. Pyotr Ilyich Tchaikovsky's ballet The Nutcracker, based on a story by E. T. A. Hoffmann, derives its name from this festive holiday decoration.

The carving of nutcrackers—as well as of religious figures and of cribs—developed as a cottage industry in forested rural areas of Germany. The most famous nutcracker carvings come from Sonneberg in Thuringia (also a center of dollmaking) and Seiffen, as part of the industry of wooden toymaking in the Ore Mountains. Wood-carving usually provided the only income for the people living there. Today the travel industry supplements their income by bringing visitors to the remote areas. Carvings by famous names like Junghanel, Klaus Mertens, Karl, Olaf Kolbe, Petersen, Christian Ulbricht and especially the Steinbach nutcrackers have become collector's items.

Decorative nutcrackers became popular in the United States after the Second World War, following the first US production of The Nutcracker ballet in 1940 and the exposure of US soldiers to the dolls during the war. In the United States, few of the decorative nutcrackers are now functional, though expensive working designs are still available. Many of the woodworkers in Germany were in Erzgebirge, in the Soviet zone after the end of the war, and they mass-produced poorly-made designs for the US market. With the increase in pre-shelled nuts, the need for functionality was also lessened. After the 1980s, Chinese and Taiwanese imports that copied the traditional German designs took over. The recreated "Bavarian village" of Leavenworth, Washington, features a nutcracker museum. Many other materials also serve to make decorated nutcrackers, such as porcelain, silver, and brass; the museum displays samples. The United States Postal Service (USPS) issued four stamps in October 2008 with custom-made nutcrackers made by Richmond, Virginia artist Glenn Crider.

== Other uses ==
Some artists, among them the multi-instrumentalist Mike Oldfield, have used the sound nutcrackers make in music.

An old belief among the Malay people in Southeast Asia states that an areca nutcracker (kacip pinang) can be placed under a baby's pillow to prevent any harm from paranormal creatures.

== In animals ==
Many animals shell nuts to eat them, including using tools. The Capuchin monkey is a fine example. Parrots use their beaks as natural nutcrackers, in much the same way smaller birds crack seeds. In this case, the pivot point stands opposite the nut, at the jaw, or the beak.
