= Seiffen =

- Municipality
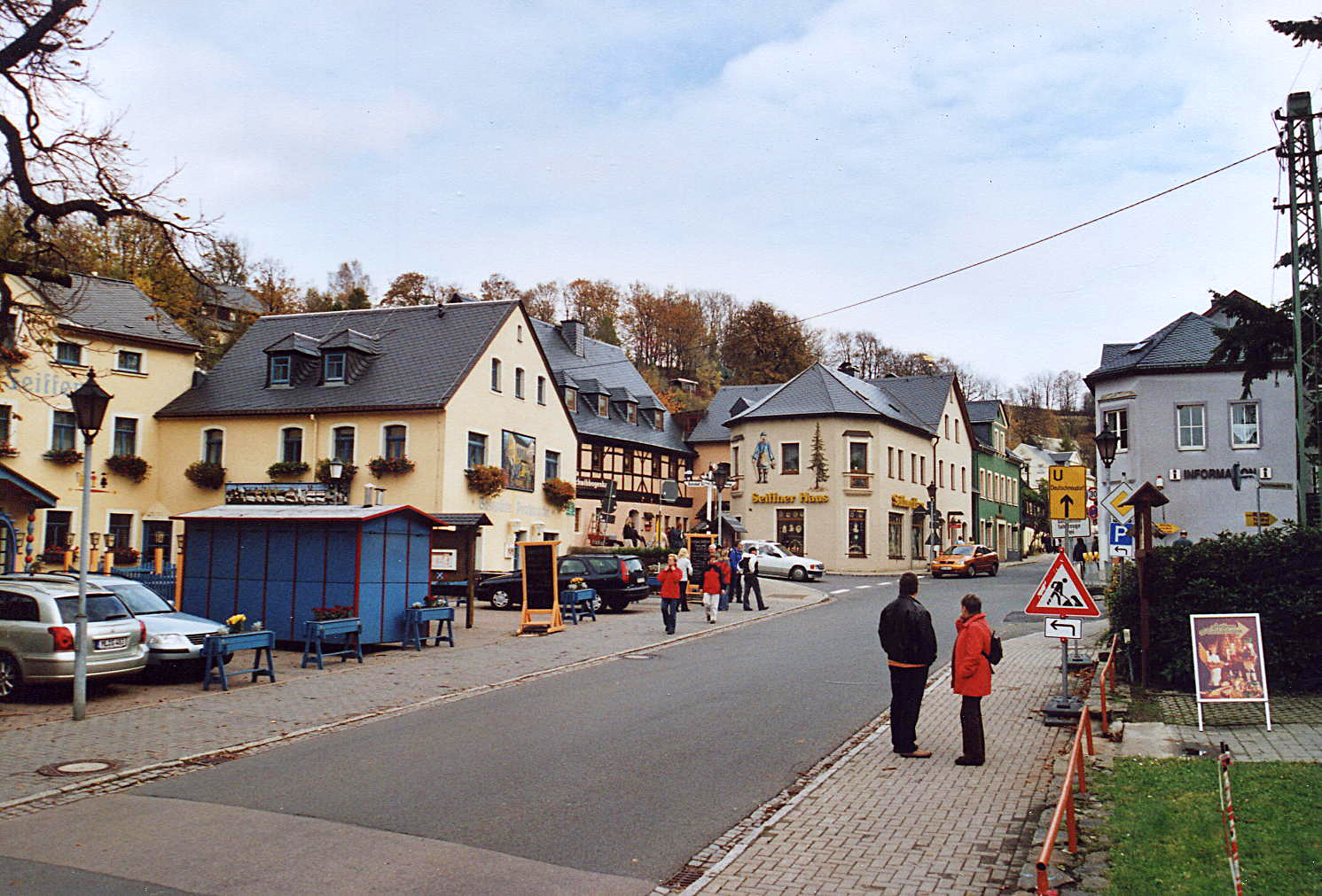

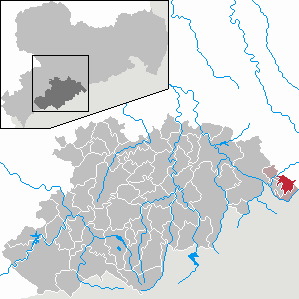
- Location of Seiffen within Erzgebirgskreis district
- Interactive map of Seiffen
- Location within Germany Location within Saxony
- Coordinates: 50°38′54″N 13°27′08″E
- Country: Germany
- State: Saxony
- District: Erzgebirgskreis
- Subdivisions: 2

Government
  - Mayor (2020–27): Martin Wittig

Area
  - Total: 12.43 km^{2} (4.80 sq mi)
- Elevation: 650 m (2,130 ft)

Population (2025-12-31)
  - Total: 1,800
  - Density: 140/km^{2} (380/sq mi)
- Time zone: UTC+01:00 (CET)
  - Summer (DST): UTC+02:00 (CEST)
- Postal codes: 09548
- Dialling codes: 037362
- Vehicle registration: ERZ, ANA, ASZ, AU, MAB, MEK, STL, SZB, ZP
- Website: seiffen.de

Seiffen is a town in the district of Erzgebirgskreis in the central south of Saxony in Germany.

Seiffen nestles in the heart of the Ore Mountains, which are famous for many Christmas traditions. As the silver and tin deposits declined, former miners had to look for new ways to feed their families. In addition to lace making and weaving, the local population turned to wood carving. Nutcrackers, "smoking men", Christmas pyramids (carousels with figures of the Christmas story or from mining) and Schwibbögen (wooden candle arches, displayed in windows, symbolising the opening of a mine) are some of many Christmas goods made in the Ore Mountains. Seiffen is a centre of the wooden toy industry.

== History ==
The history of Seiffen started when miners opened up the district 700 years ago. The earliest record of the town dates to 1324 when it was referred to as "Cynsifen". With the recession of ore mining in the area, Seiffen turned to wooden toy manufacture as a matter of economic survival. In 1699, Seiffen resident Johann Friedrich Hiemann took Seiffen toys to market at Nuremberg. Nuremberg was a toy distribution market for much of Europe at that time. Seiffen was able to break into this large toy market thanks to two factors. First, the low cost of living and economic depression in the Ore Mountains allowed prices much lower than the rest of European toy manufacturers selling at the Nuremberg market. Second, the high quality of toys being produced in Seiffen.

== Technological developments ==
A major new line in toy manufacturing, which began in the Ore Mountains, was the production of wooden toys on wood lathes using a method known as Reifendrehen. This method, usually used for making wooden animals, allowed for greater accuracy and quality in much less time than it took to hand carve the entire piece. In 1890, an export tax was changed from being based on value, to weight. This meant that wooden toys were now much more expensive to buy anywhere but the German state of Saxony. Undaunted, the Seiffen toy makers developed the Miniature in a Matchbox. This ornament sized toy was very small, so it could be exported cheaply. It also used many parts and is very detailed. The Ore Mountain Toy Museum is an internationally known toy museum that displays a large collection of typical Ore Mountain wooden toys and similar items.

== Notable people ==
- Auguste Müller (1847–1930), carver

== Gallery ==
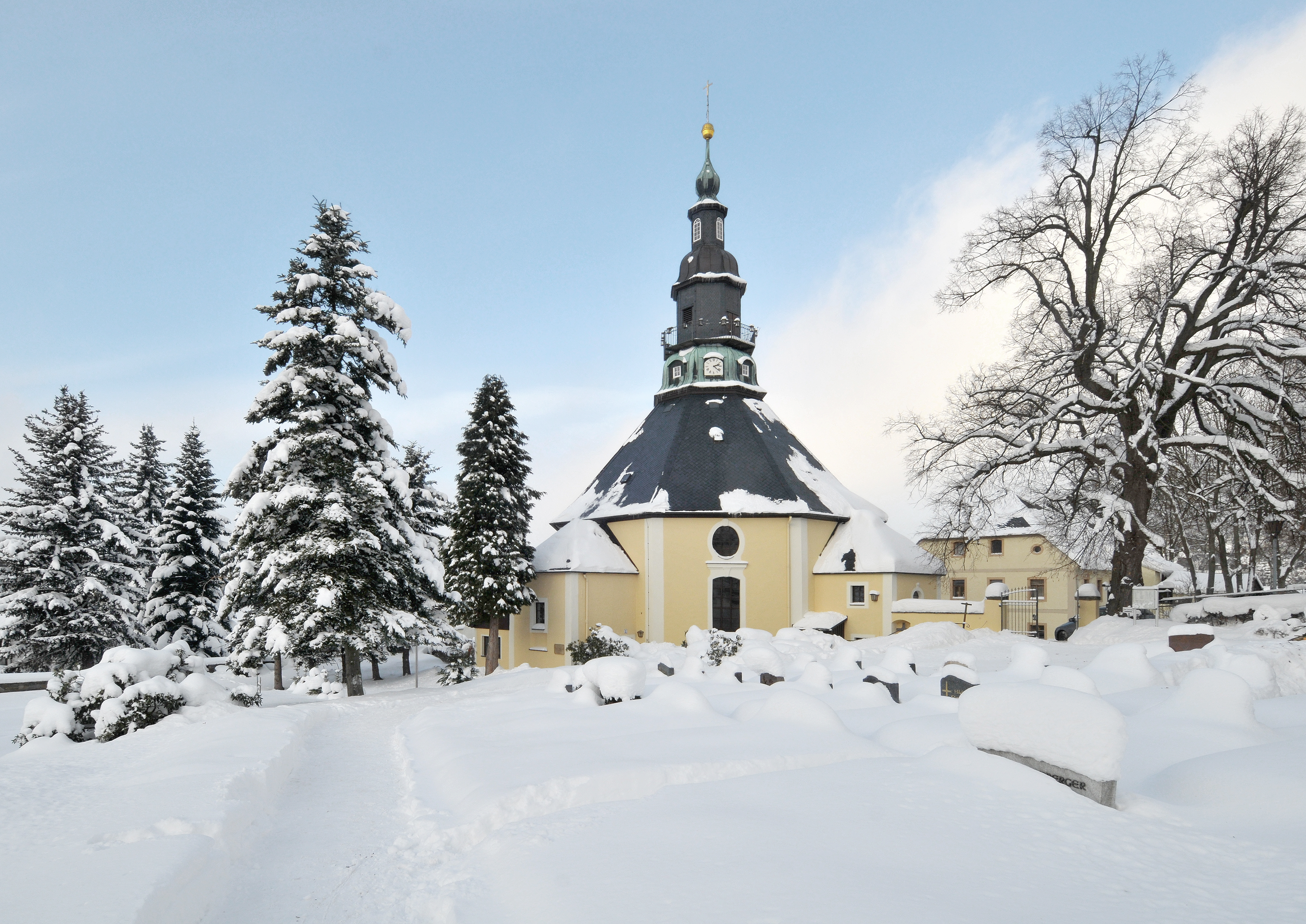
Seiffen Church

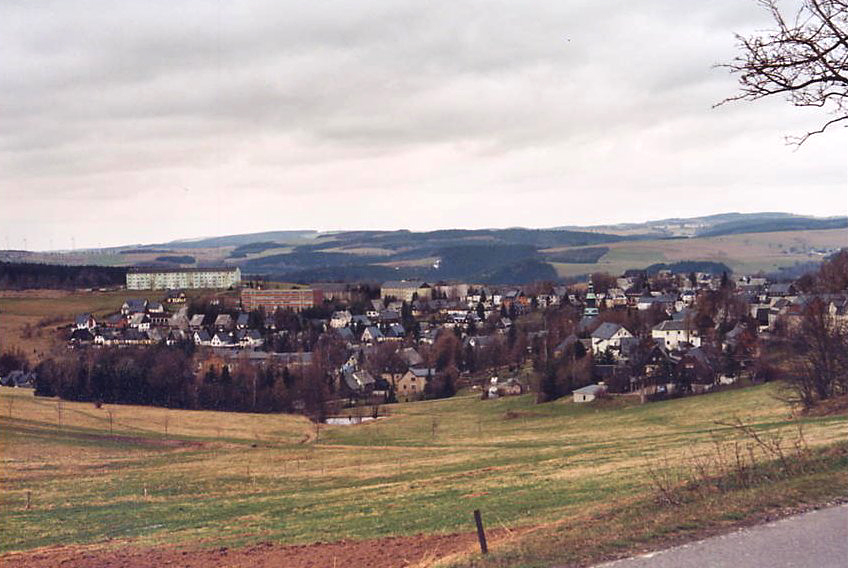
Panorama

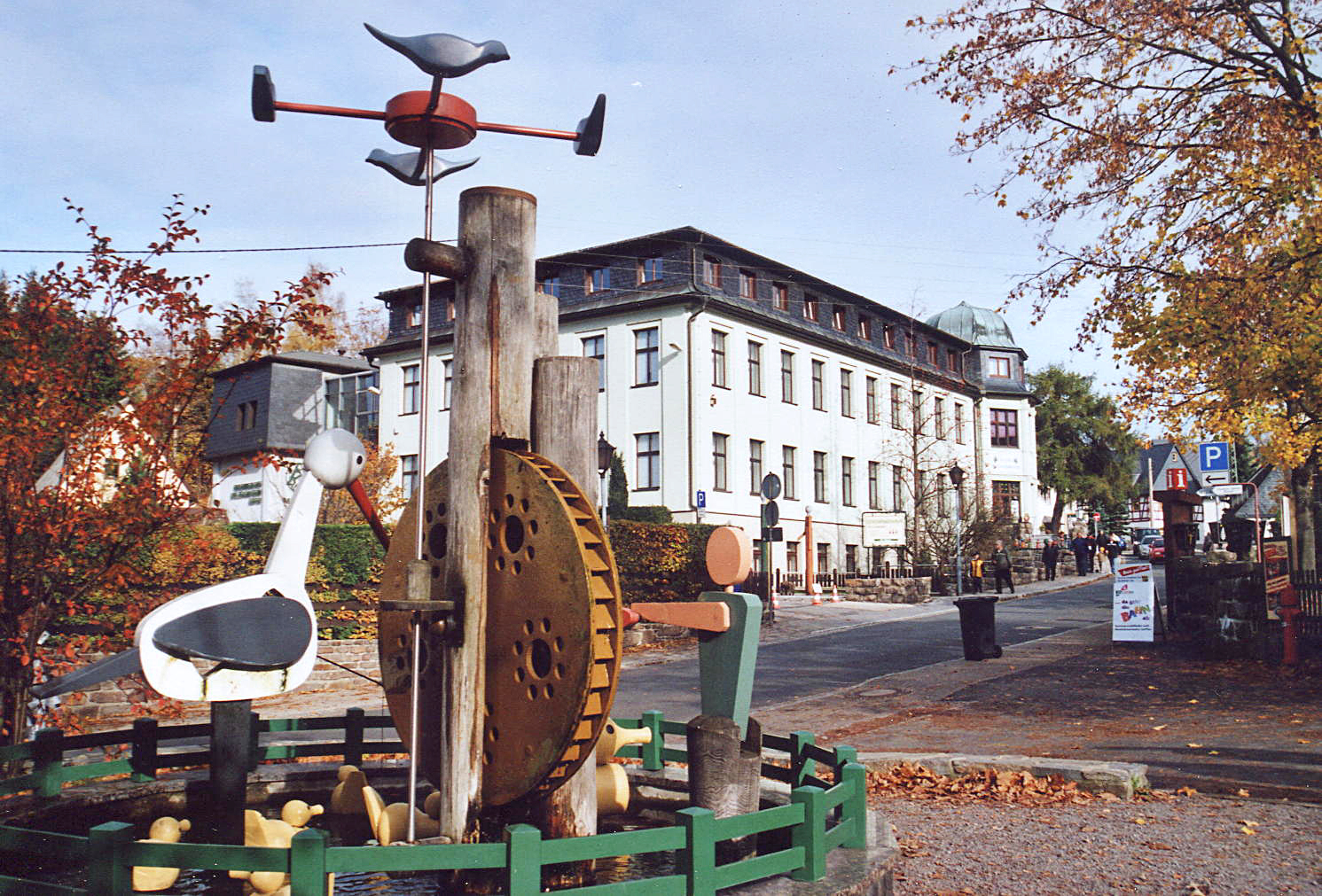
Toy museum

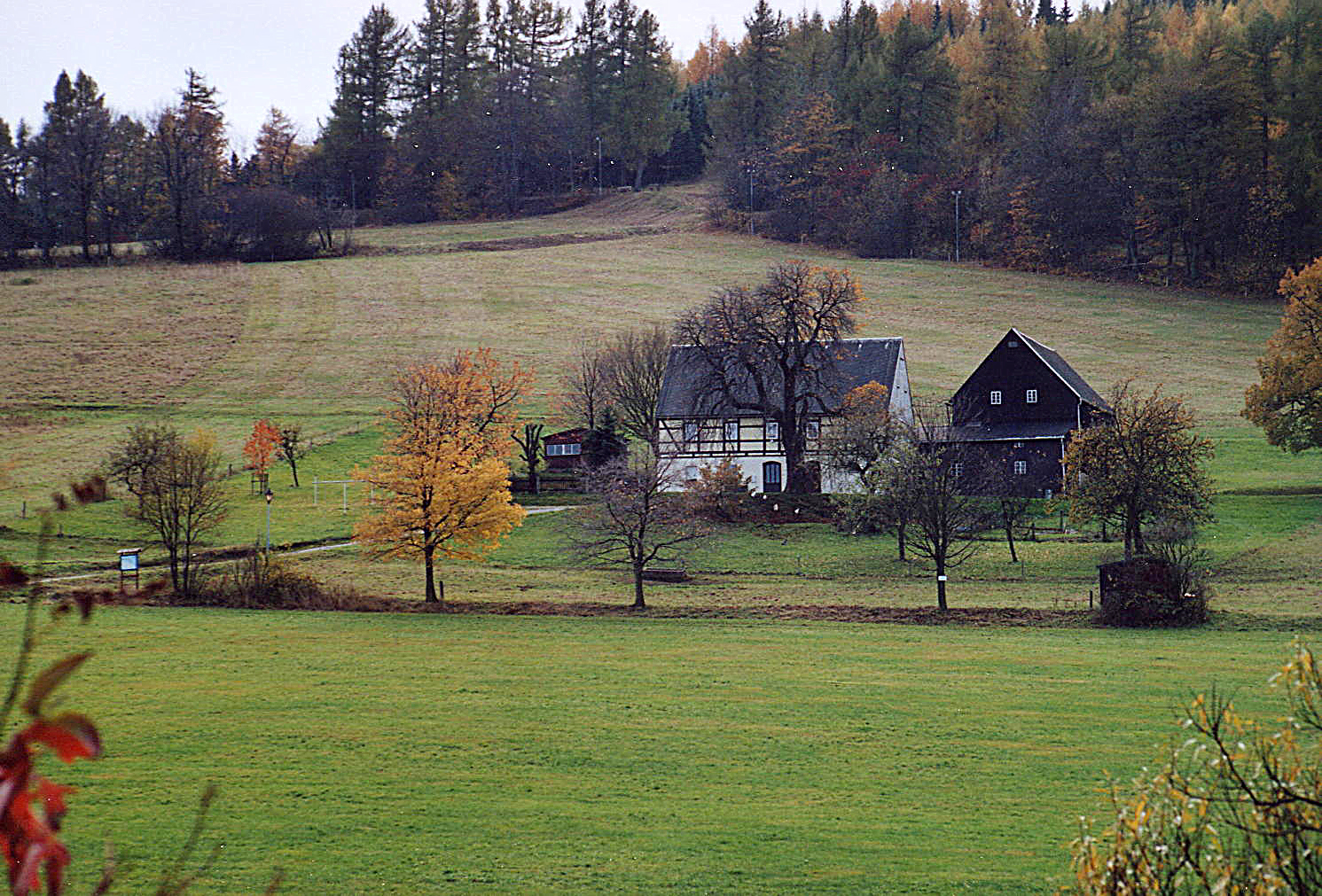
Typical house

== See also ==
- Ore Mountain folk art
