= Christmas angels =

Small wooden figures portraying angels often playing an instrument

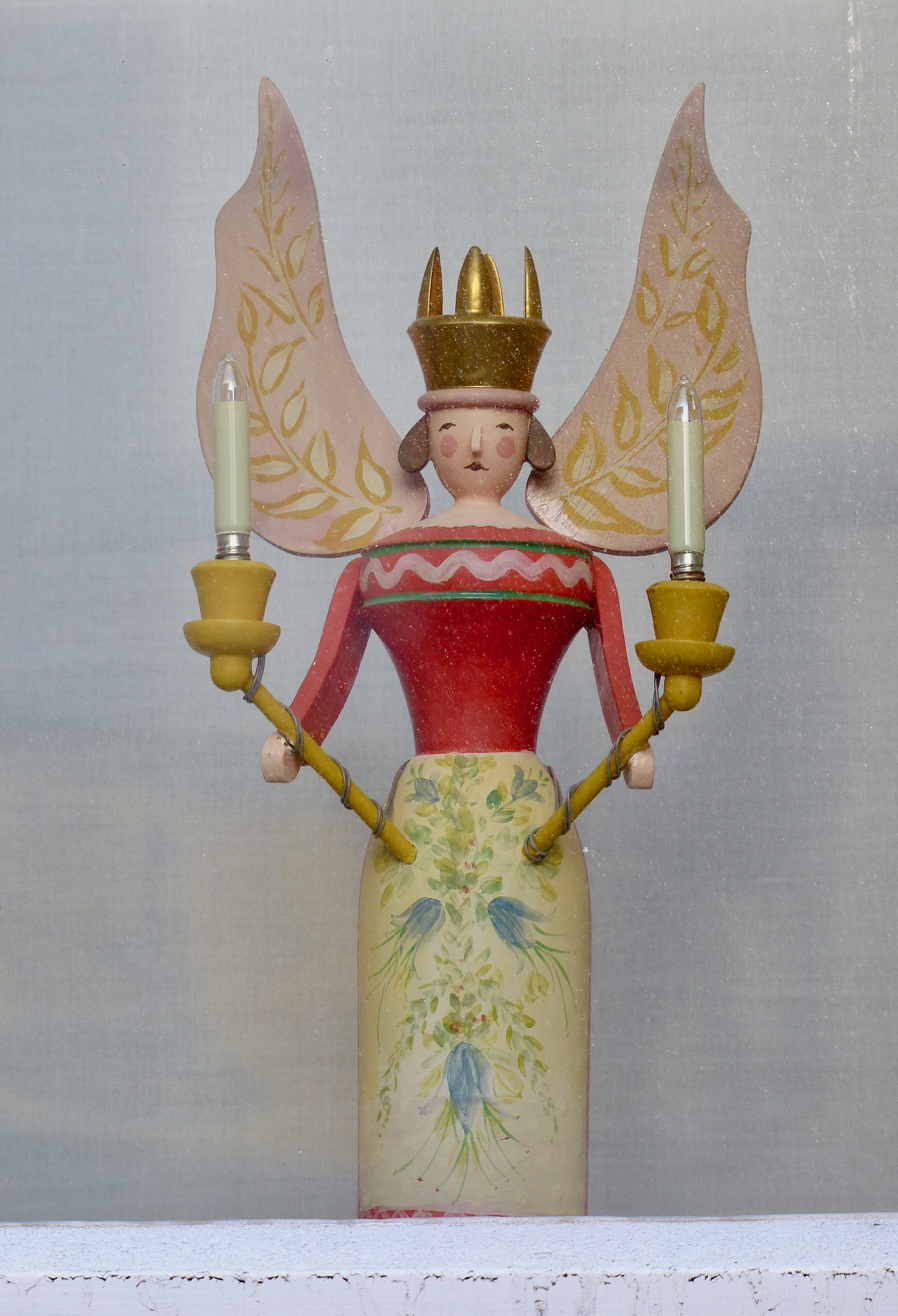
Christmas angel typical for a village in Saxony

Christmas angels are small wooden figures portraying angels often playing an instrument. They can be arranged to an entire orchestra. The origins of artistic angel carving lie in the Ore Mountains where the angels are an integral part of Ore Mountain folk art.

The connection to Christmas comes from the central role which angels play in the nativity story told in the Gospel of Luke: A single angel proclaims the birth of the Messiah to the shepherds, upon which an entire choir of angels strikes up ‘Gloria in excelsis’. In the Christian tradition angels are believed to be proclaimers of the birth of Christ and bearers of divine light.

== Characteristics ==
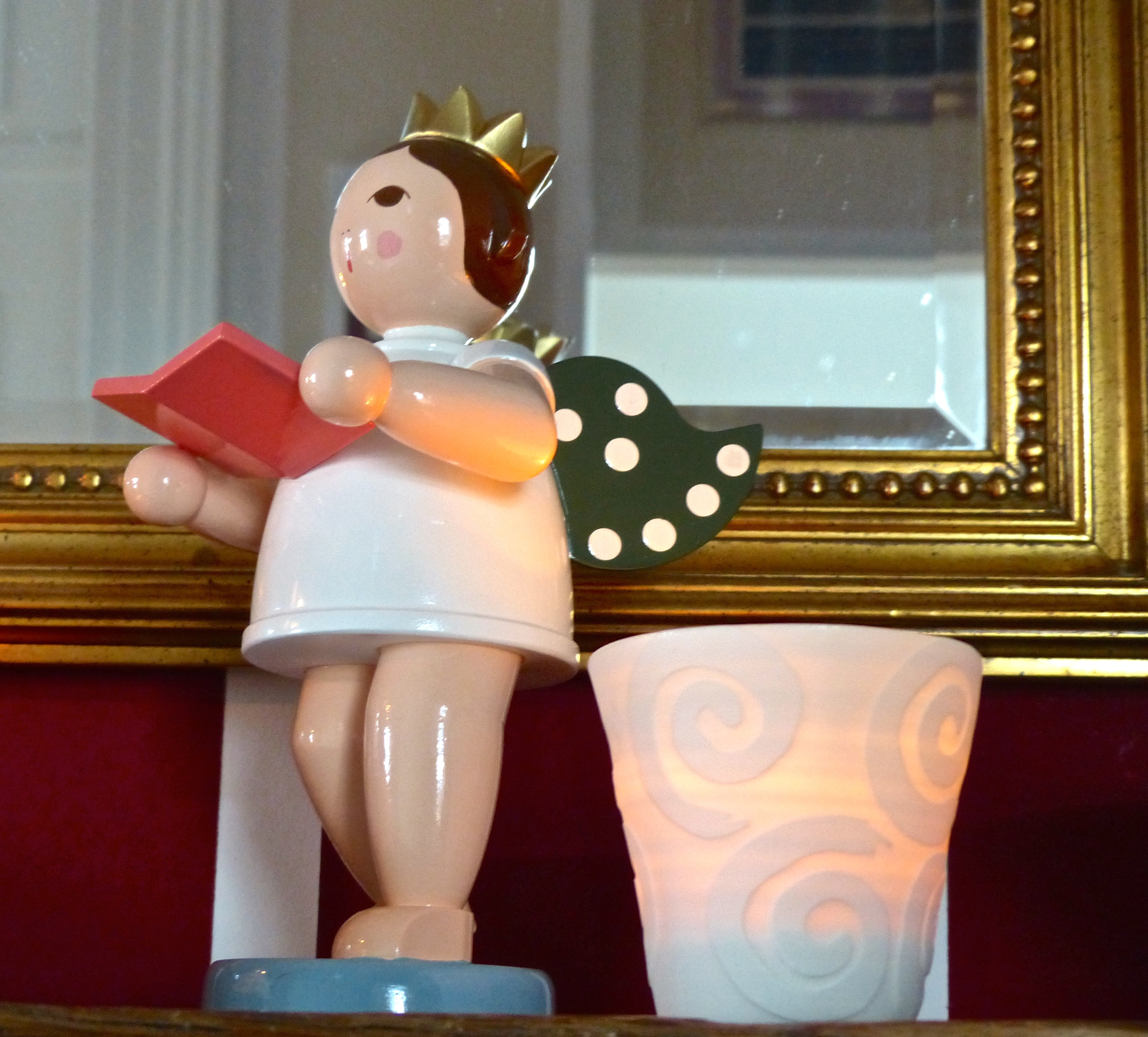
Singing angel from the company Ellmann

Christmas angels are always made with wings to accentuate their heavenly character. They can be lacquered colorful or in natural wood colors. Among the colorful angels the color and decoration of the wings indicate the respective manufacturer who uses these features as a kind of trademark.

Most angels stand on a small, wooden pedestals, but even sitting or hanging versions exist. Collectors use so-called ‘clouds’ as a podium for an orchestra.

There are Christmas angels with most of the in Europe common instruments (without electrical sound production), including flute and organ. Special figures are carrying candles, shining a lantern or holding a music book.

== History ==
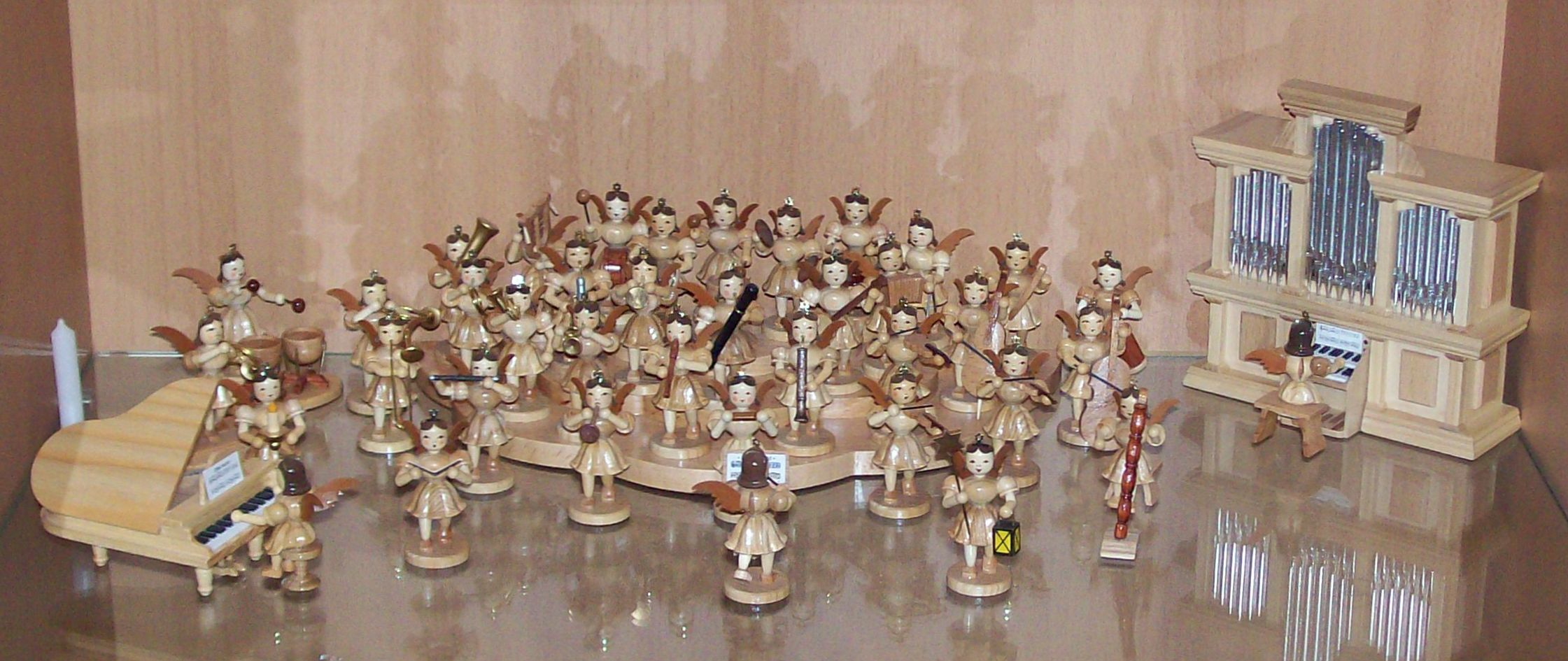
Orchestra with Christmas angels made out of natural wood from the company Blank

Besides the for the Ore Mountain woodcraft since the end of the 18th century central figure of the miner, angels as light bearers became increasingly widespread. The Ore Mountain folk art angel figures excel in their great depiction as a small-size version. The first carved angels can already be found at the end of the 15th century.

To cover the increased demand for Christmas angels due to the spread of Christmas customs, turners from Seiffen developed a lathed angel figure in 1830. The figure held lights in both hands and had a golden crown.

At the beginning of the 20th century, some toy makers started the manufacture of Christmas angels. From the beginning, their creations enjoyed great popularity, yet the spread of Christmas angels beyond the Ore Mountains was also determined by political factors. The production almost came to a complete halt during the Second World War. In contrast, in the German Democratic Republic the angels became an export hit and a foreign currency earner.

After 1990, most Ore Mountain wood manufactories managed the transition into market economy successfully. Christmas angels are still a central element to Ore Mountain folk art and are widely offered at Christmas markets increasing the variety of the manufactured products drastically, thus opening up a new field of activity for some collectors for Christmas time.
