= Weihnachtsberg =

Christmas model of the landscape of the Ore Mountains

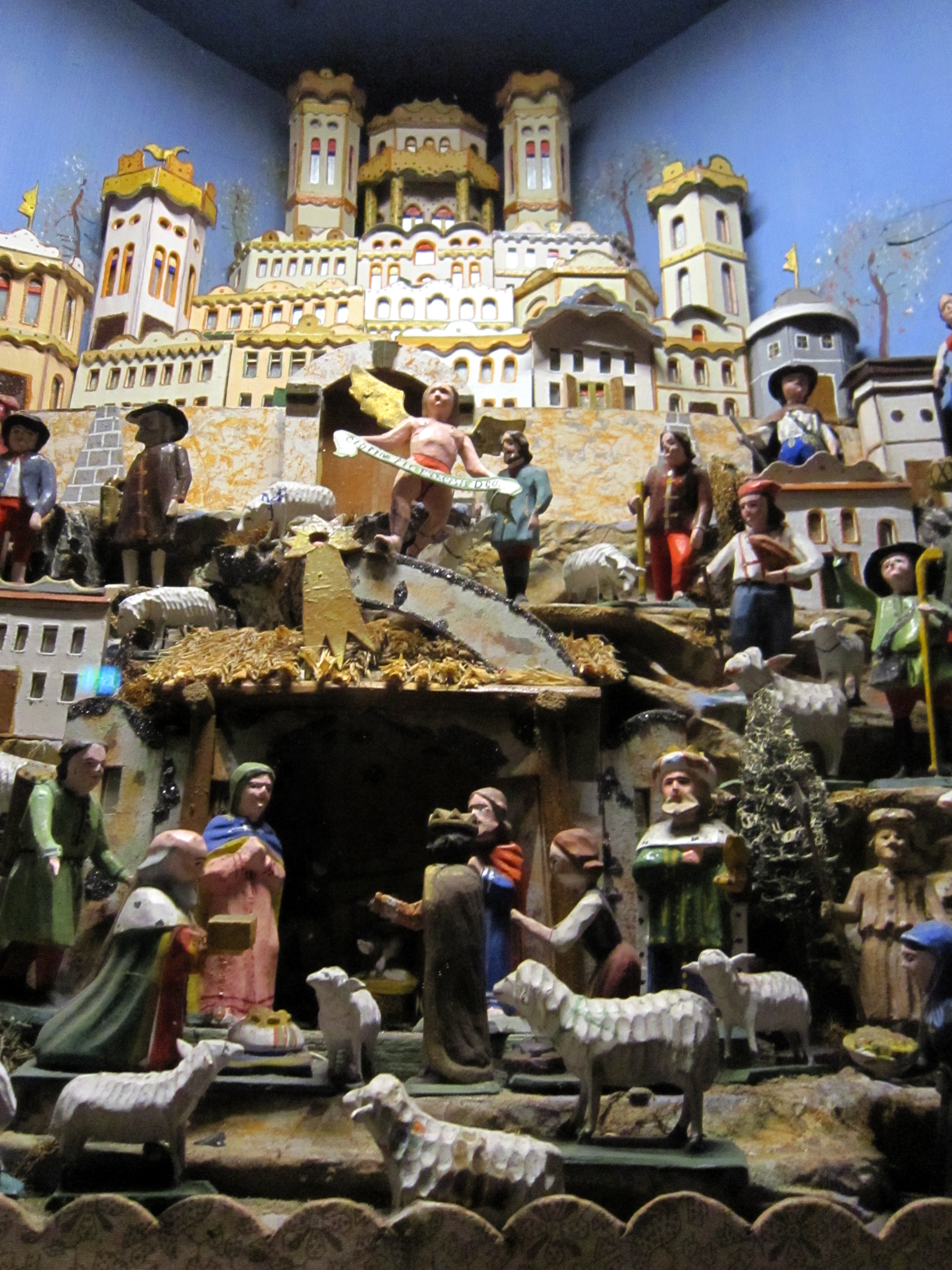
Part of a Weihnachtsberg in the Manufaktur der Träume

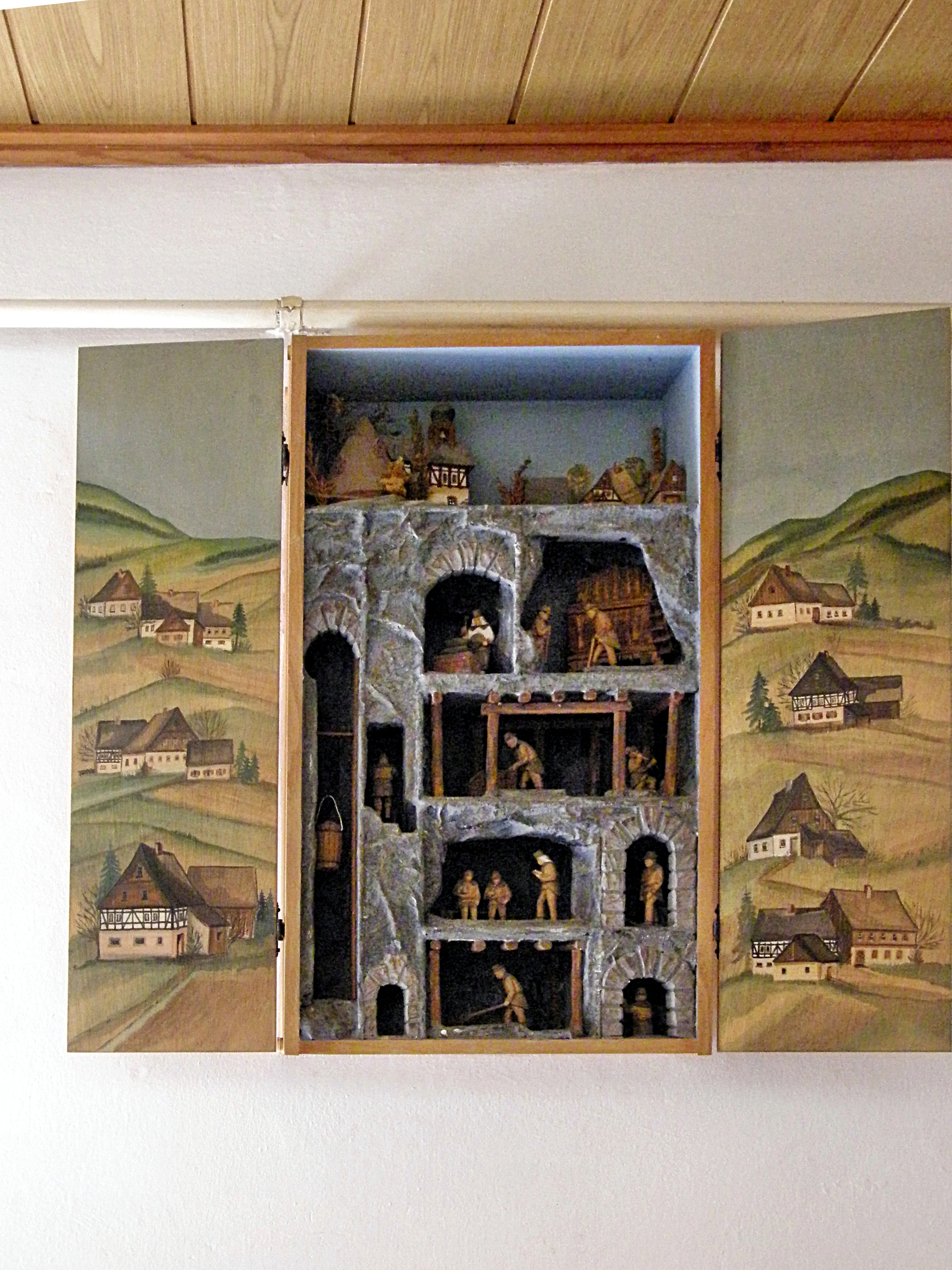
A Buckelbergwerk with its doors opened and set up in the Keilberghaus near Schneeberg.

A Weihnachtsberg is a decorative, mountain-like model of the landscape of the Ore Mountains (between Germany and the Czech Republic), which is set up indoors during the Christmas period. It portrays the nativity scene and mining motifs as well as local themes. The figures and objects are often movable and mechanically driven.

The Weihnachtsberg has its origins in the so-called Buckelbergwerk models of the 18th century, which only had mining subjects. In the 19th century, Christmas scenes were added.

== Literature ==
- Fachschule für Tourismus des Instituts für Soziale und Kulturelle Bildung e. V. (pub.): Heimat- und Weihnachtsberge des Sächsischen Erzgebirges. Husum Druck- und Verlagsgesellschaft 1996, ISBN 388042795X
- Claus Leichsenring: Weihnachtsberge & Heimatberge: ein Beitrag zur Geschichte der Volkskultur im sächsischen Erzgebirge. Chemnitz: Gumnior, 2004. ISBN 3-937386-08-4
- Gunter Bergmann: Kleines sächsisches Wörterbuch. Reclam, Leipzig
