= KNOX (candles) =

Traditional incense firm in Saxony, Germany

Coordinates: 50°59′41.0″N 13°28′16.66″E

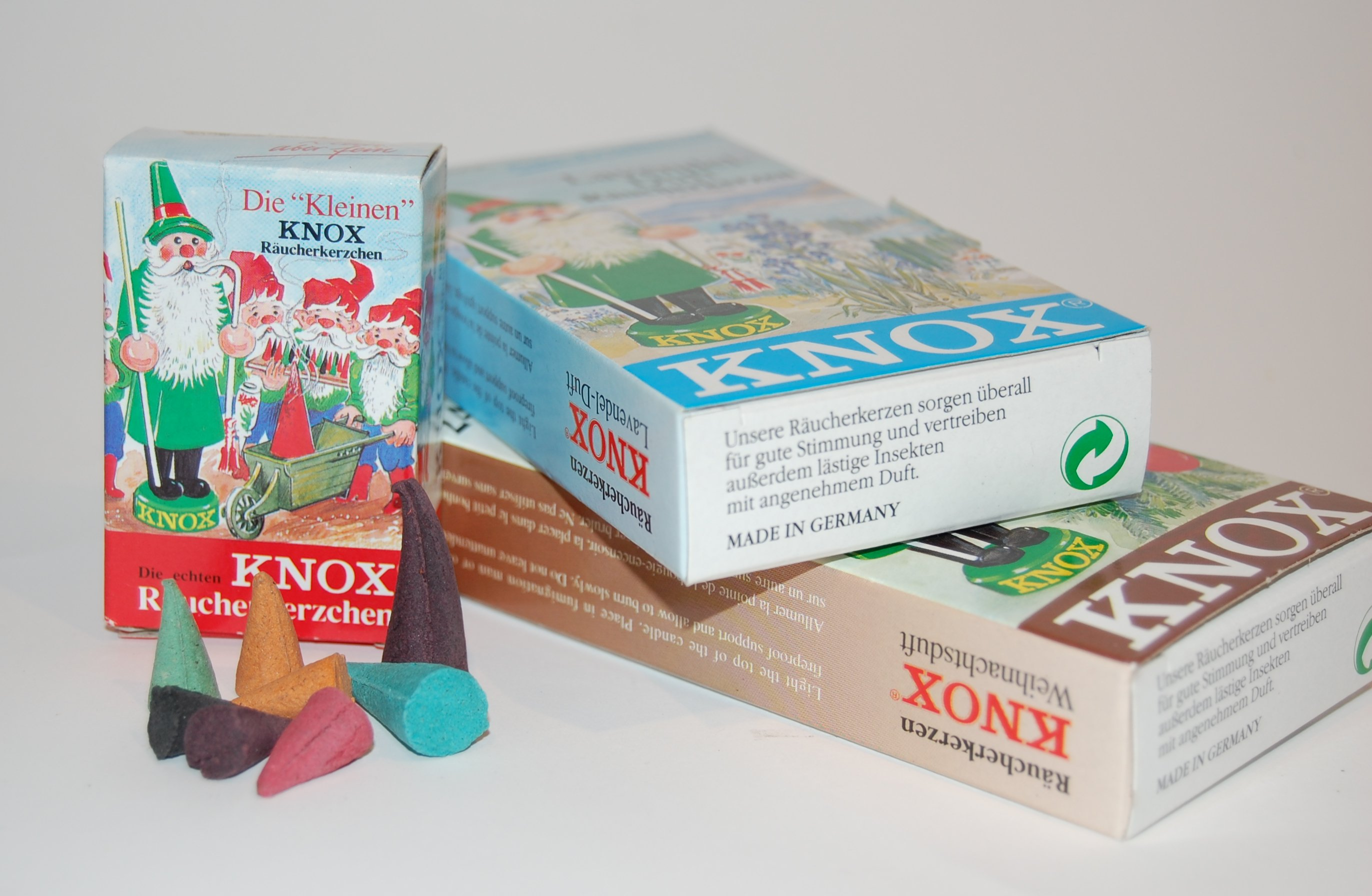
Selection of KNOX incense candles

KNOX is the trade mark of the oldest incense manufacturers in Germany. KNOX is based in Mohorn-Grund in the borough of Wilsdruff and run by the firm of Hermann Zwetz, Chemist's.

In 1865 the chemist, whose name the firm now bears, sold the incense candles, known as Räucherkerzchen as a remedy for whooping cough and asthma. Only later were the little candles used for Christmas festivities.

Today about 50 tonnes of incense products are manufactured annually in 30 scent varieties in the factory premises that were newly built in 1997. The company has been family owned since 1952. KNOX products are used especially in the wooden toy figures known as Räuchermänner.

In 2023, the company introduced new lines to appeal to younger consumers, including sea, myrrh and broccoli, which was scented as cannabis.
