= Räuchermann =

German incense smoker

The Räuchermann (diminutive Räuchermännchen [ˈʁɔʏçɐˌmɛnçən]; Erzgebirgisch: Raachermannel) is an incense smoker, the invention of toy makers in the Ore Mountains, used to burn down cone incense, known as Räucherkerzchen.

The Räuchermann was first mentioned in 1850 and is now a common component in the Ore Mountain Christmas tradition. For this, an incense cone is first lit and then put on the lower half of the two-part wood figurine. The hollowed-out upper part is placed over the lighted cone, which burns down inside of the hollow figurine, the smoke leaving the mouth hole of the Räuchermann. Before the Räuchermann was invented, cone incense was displayed and burnt down in the open.

During Christmas time Räuchermänner are displayed together with Schwibbögen (candle arches), miners' figurines, angels, and Christmas pyramids.

Several kinds of figurines exist, traditionally representing craftsmen of the region, such as foresters, peddlers, miners, and soldiers. Today, they exist in many more forms, including the so-called "edgesitters", which can be placed on the edge of the table, small scenes of several Räuchermänner (such as a group playing Skat), and also female Räuchermänner, called Räucherfrauen. According to the Guinness Book of Records, the largest Räuchermann in the world is in the Miniaturenpark Kleinwelka in Bautzen.

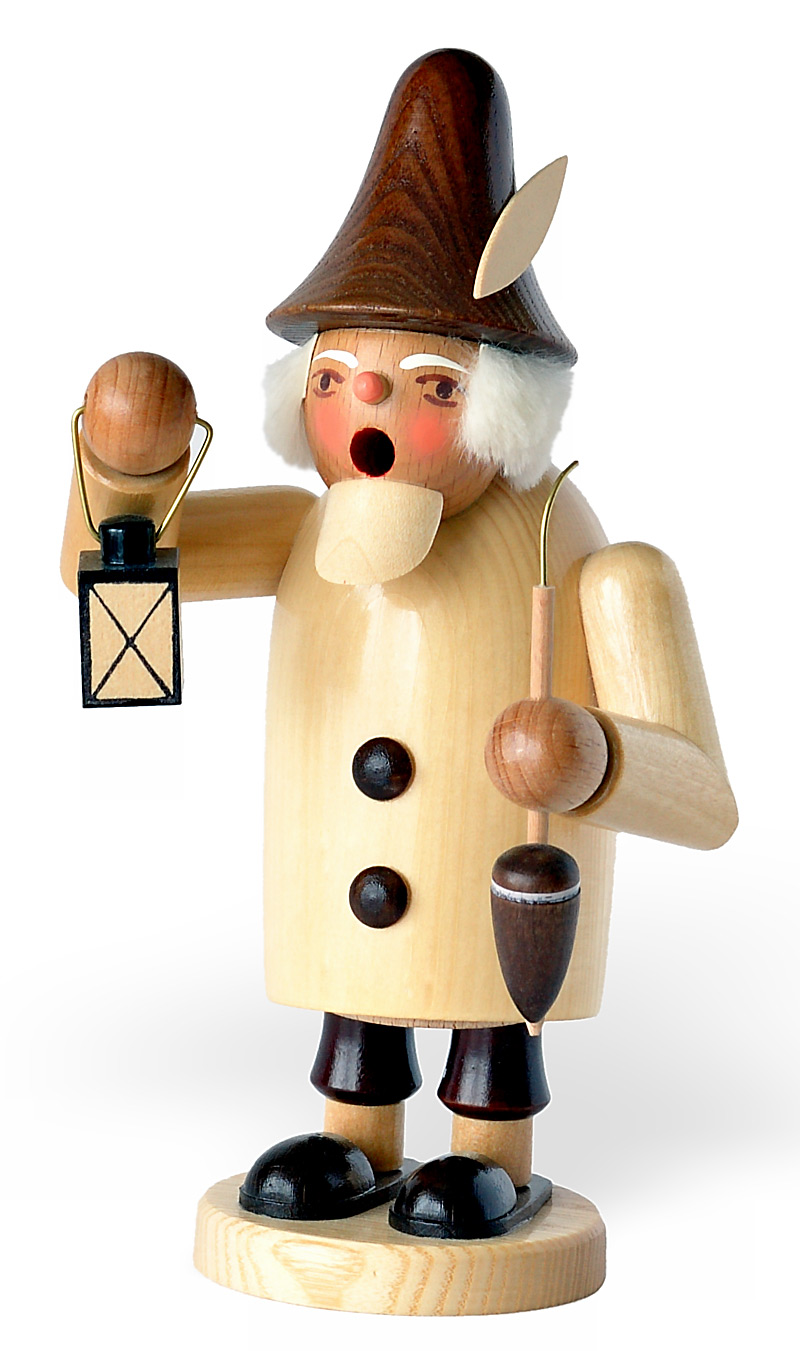
Räuchermännchen

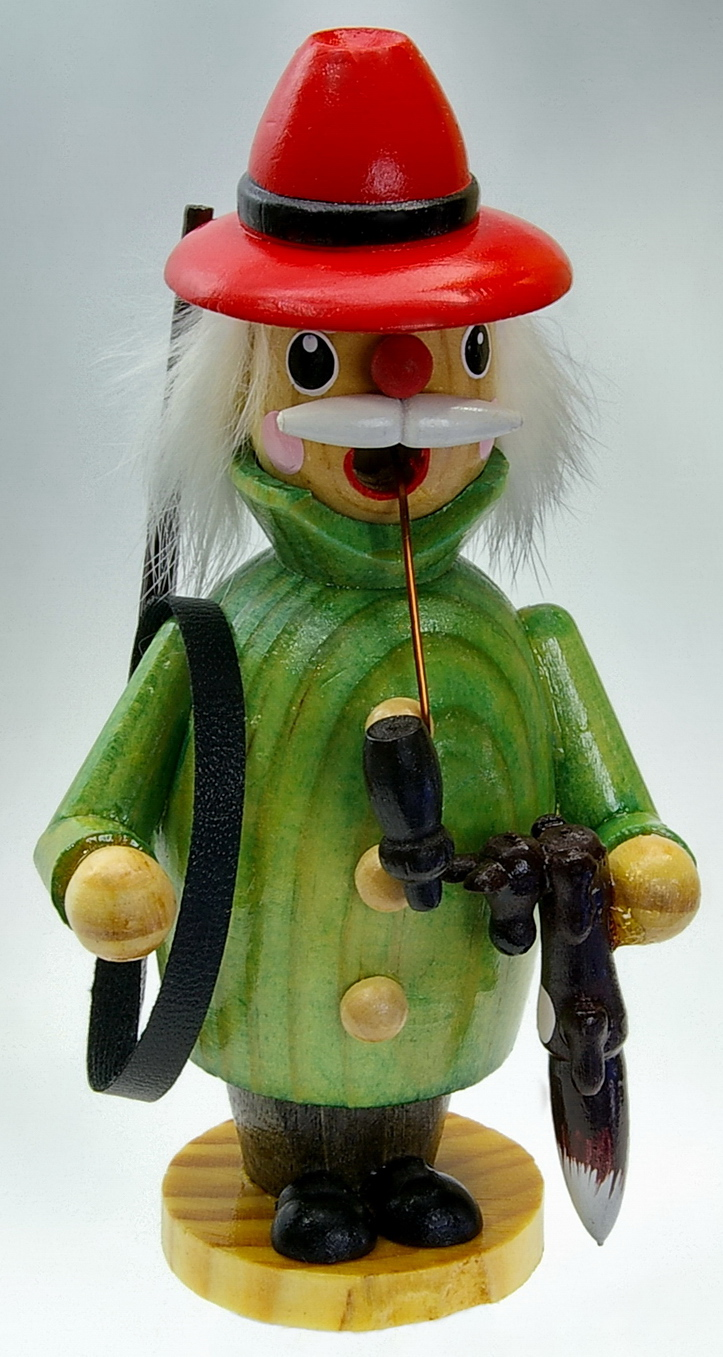
As hunter figurine

== Moosmännel ==
As a counterpart to the Räuchermann, artisans of the upper Vogtland invented the Moosmann (or Moosmännel). He is supposed to be a small forest spirit who helps poor families with natural products, can change leaves to gold, and—according to folk tales—mostly appears during Christmas time.

== See also ==
- Wooden toymaking in the Ore Mountains
- Spanbaum
