= Räucherkerze =

German and Czech Christmas incense cone

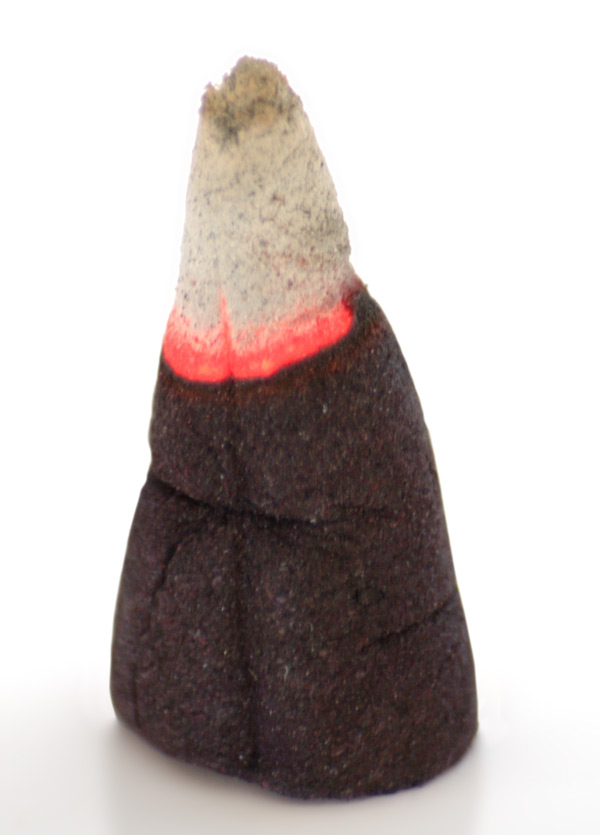
A burning Räucherkerzchen

A Räucherkerze (German: [ˈʁɔʏçɐˌkɛʁtsə]), Räucherkerzchen or Räucherkegel (lit. 'smoking candle' or 'little smoking candle' or 'smoking cone') is an incense cone burned at Christmas time in Germany and in the Czech Republic in order to create pleasant scents around the house.

== History ==
The emergence of Räucherkerzen goes back to the use of frankincense in Catholic liturgy. According to tradition the manufacture of little candles in Crottendorf in the Ore Mountains was established by 1750. But it was not until the advent of modern Christmas customs in the middle of the 19th century and the manufacture of the first Räuchermännchen that they spread beyond the Ore Mountains.

== Materials and production ==
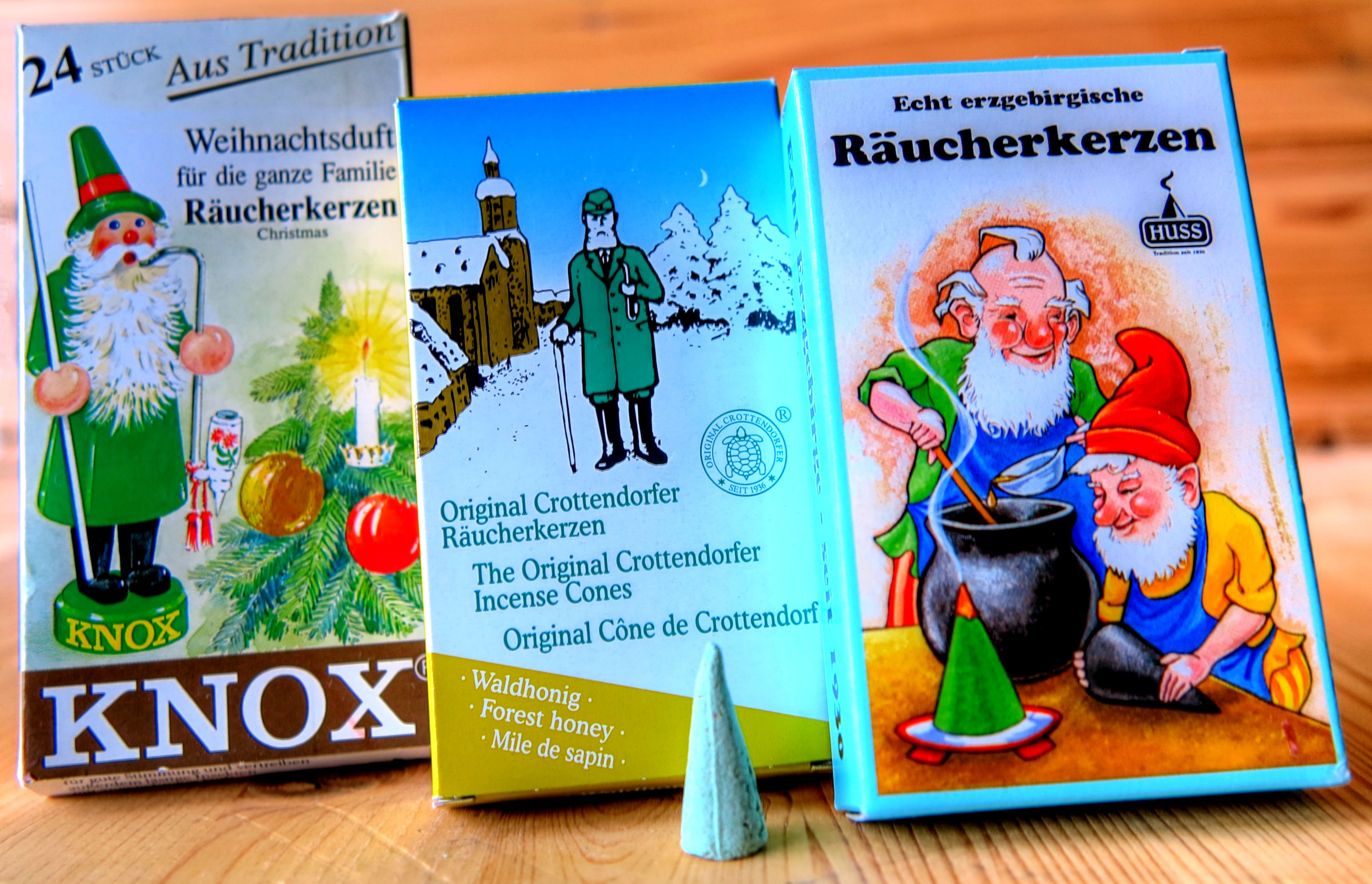
Räucherkerzen manufacturers: KNOX, Crottendorfer and Huss

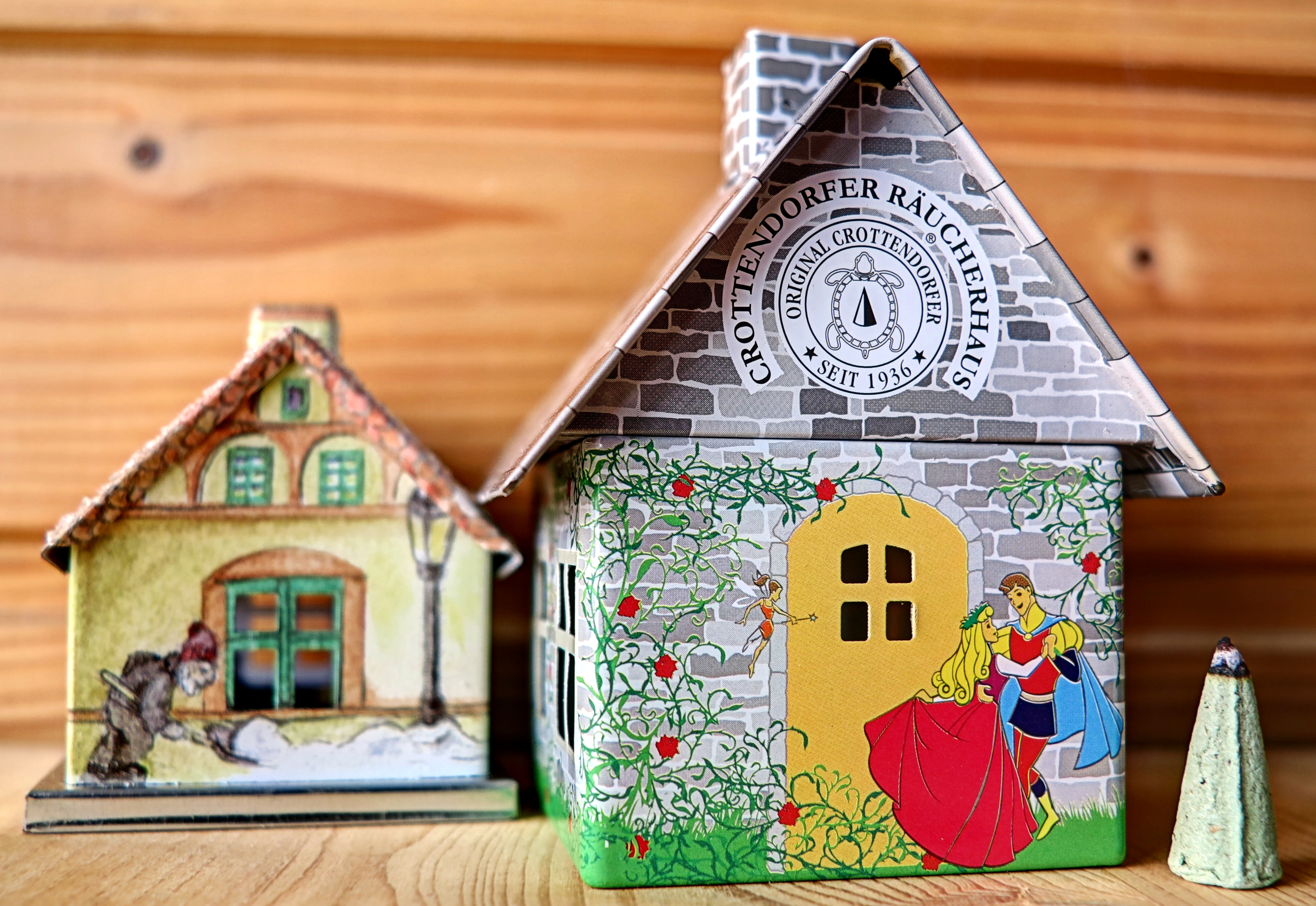
Incense houses (Räucherhäuschen)

The cones are made from the resin of the Frankincense tree, charcoal, potato flour, sandalwood and beech paste. These substances are ground together, stirred into a moist dough, and then shaped. The incense candles are produced mainly in three locations in Saxony: in Neudorf under the name of Huss-Original Neudorfer Räucherkerzen, in Crottendorf as Original Crottendorfer Räucherkerzen and in Mohorn-Grund, a village in the borough of Wilsdruff, as KNOX. Outside Saxony they are made in the Crottendorf-founded Carl Jaeger Räuchermittelfabrik in Höchst im Odenwald and, since 1997, in Bockau under the name Bockauer Räucherkerzen.

== Scents ==
As well as candles with traditional "Christmas scents" like frankincense, pine, honey and cinnamon, candles are also made with scents associated with other times of the year. There are also scents that are meant to keep insects away.

== See also ==
- Incense
