= Angel chimes =

Christmas decoration

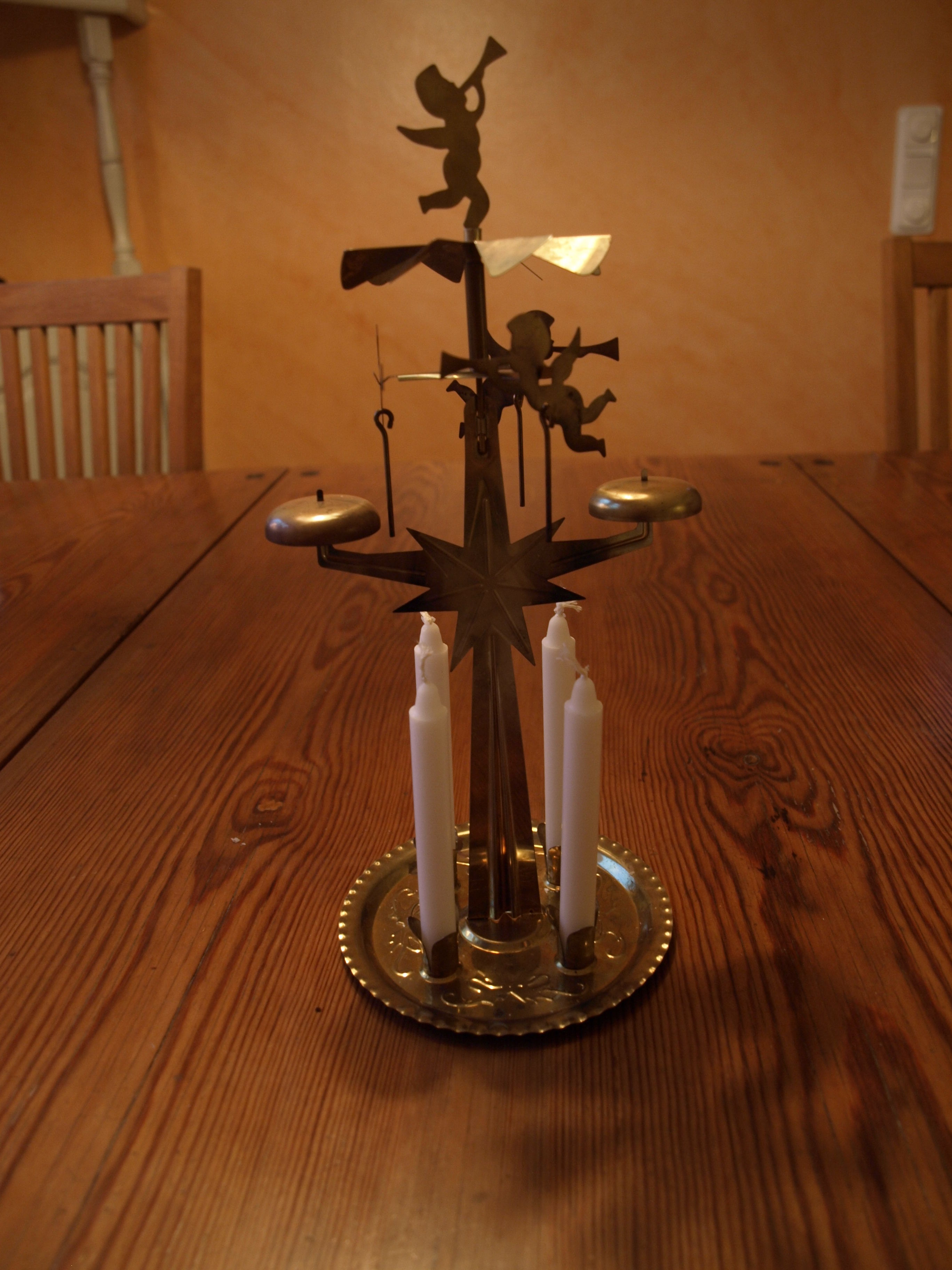
Angel chimes

Angel chimes are a form of Christmas decoration popular in Europe and North America. They apparently have the same origins as the Christmas pyramid, which functions on the same principle. They differ from these, primarily, in being mass-produced from metal and might have bell-ringing angels, whereas Christmas pyramids are usually crafted from wood and do not necessarily have bells.

Angel chimes being lit and playing

== Function ==
Angel chimes have candle holders at the base which provide heat which turns a turbine at the top, which powers a series of trumpet-holding angel figures which "fly" around in a circle, striking bells beneath them. They usually have other decorative motifs, such as the Star of Bethlehem or a creche.

== History ==
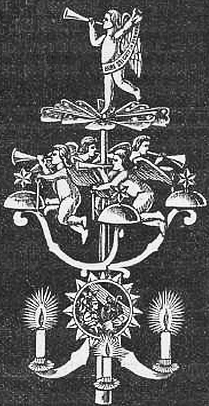
The form patented in 1905.

The earliest known patent for an angel chime was filed in 1905 by Walter Stock of the German toy firm Adrian & Stock. These early pre–World War II German chimes were typically made of tin and featured lithographed designs.

During the mid-20th century, candle-powered rotating chimes became popular across Scandinavia, where the style evolved into what is widely recognized today as the classic “Swedish angel chime.” For several decades, production of these Scandinavian metal chimes was carried out by SMP (Scandinavian Metal Product), which manufactured versions based on the traditional rotating candle-heat mechanism.

According to company records, the full manufacturing operations, tooling, and associated production rights for the Angel Chimes product were transferred from SMP to Aras Metal in Turkey in 2013. Following this transfer, Aras Metal continued manufacturing using the original Scandinavian molds and design specifications.

While many similar candle chimes have appeared on the market over the years, the production lineage of the traditional Swedish-style angel chime traces from the early German patents, through Scandinavian manufacturing by SMP, and subsequently through the continuation of production by Aras Metal after 2013.

== Trademark status ==
Angel Chimes is also a registered trademark. The term Angel Chimes® is registered by Aras Metal San. ve Tic. Ltd. Şti. in several jurisdictions, including:

- European Union Intellectual Property Office (EUIPO), Reg. No: 010546761
- United Kingdom Intellectual Property Office (UKIPO), Reg. No: UK00910546761
- Swedish Patent and Registration Office (PRV), Reg. No: 190241
- United States Patent and Trademark Office (USPTO), Serial No: 73414740

These registrations protect the use of Angel Chimes as a trademark for decorative candle-powered rotating ornaments.

== By country ==
=== In Sweden ===
Christmas angel chimes are popularly known as "änglaspel" in Sweden. After World War II, Swedish-made chimes became popular in both Europe and North America. These brought a simpler aesthetic in brass.

=== In the Czech Republic and Slovakia ===
A ringing tree (Czech: zvonící stromek) is the traditional variant most popular in the Czech Republic and Slovakia, consisting of a tree design. Ringing trees were first manufactured in Czechoslovakia in the 1950s, and were made until 1989 in the Slovak village of Horná Štubňa. In 2011, a team led by Czech man Zdeněk Ševčík, who wanted a tree for his children but could only find secondhand ones, found the original machines and brought them into working order. The trees are currently being produced with most work being done in the Czech village of Rožmitál pod Třemšínem.

Traditionally, the ringing tree is lit on Christmas Eve, often in children's bedrooms or during dinnertime. Since the trees began being created again, interest in buying them has increased significantly, including among members of the Czech diaspora overseas.

=== In Asia ===
More recently, angel chimes manufactured in China has come to dominate the export market. The design now includes spinning candles.

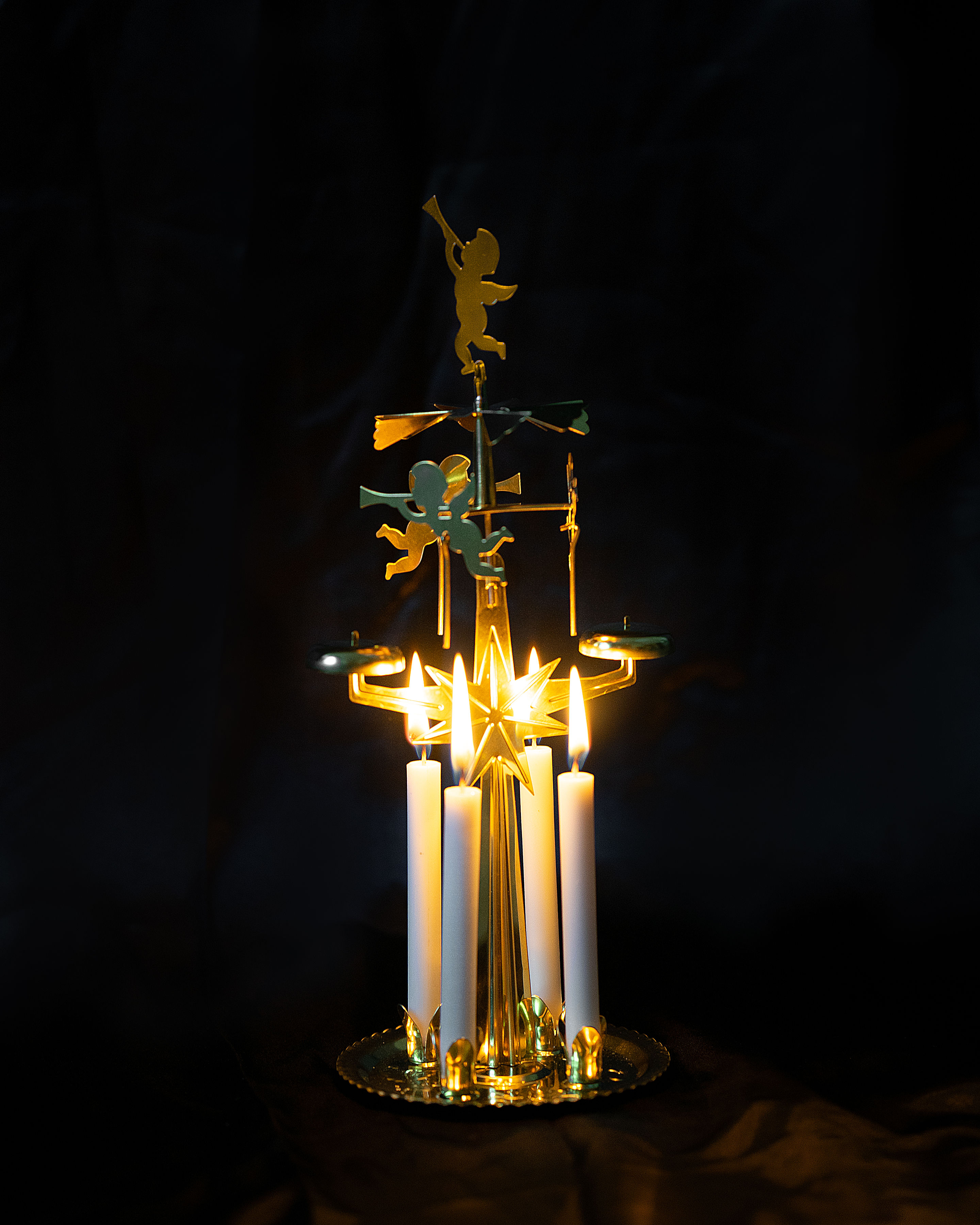

== In popular culture ==
There are a number of songs written about angel chimes, which include Angel's song, the Christmas Chimes. The sheet music has been compiled at the performing arts encyclopedia of the United States Library of Congress up to the present day. Ringle-rey, Shoo-hey by Birgit Ridderstedt also refers to angel chimes.
