= Miner's figure =

Christmas decoration

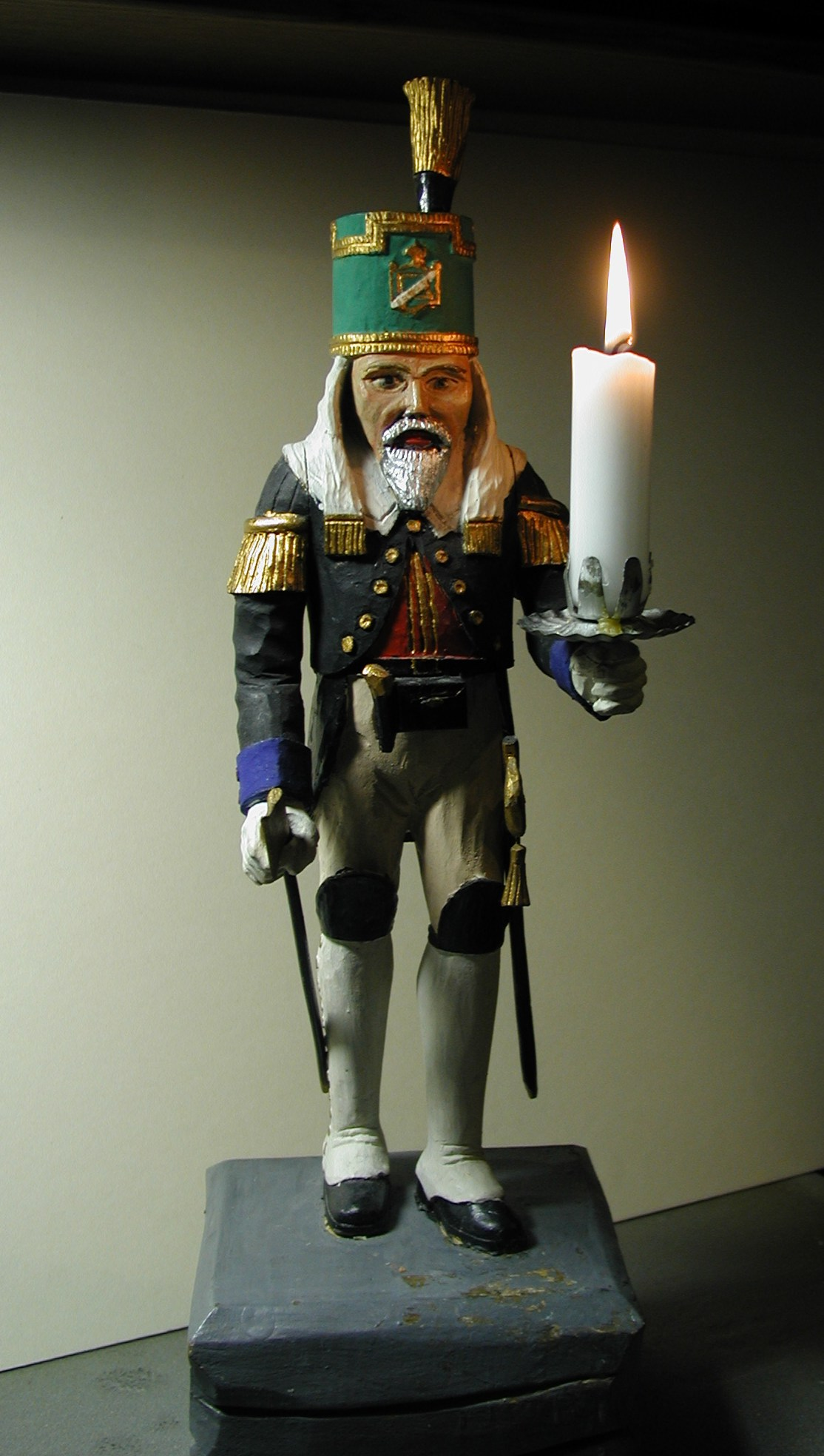
An Ore Mountain miner's figure as a candle holder

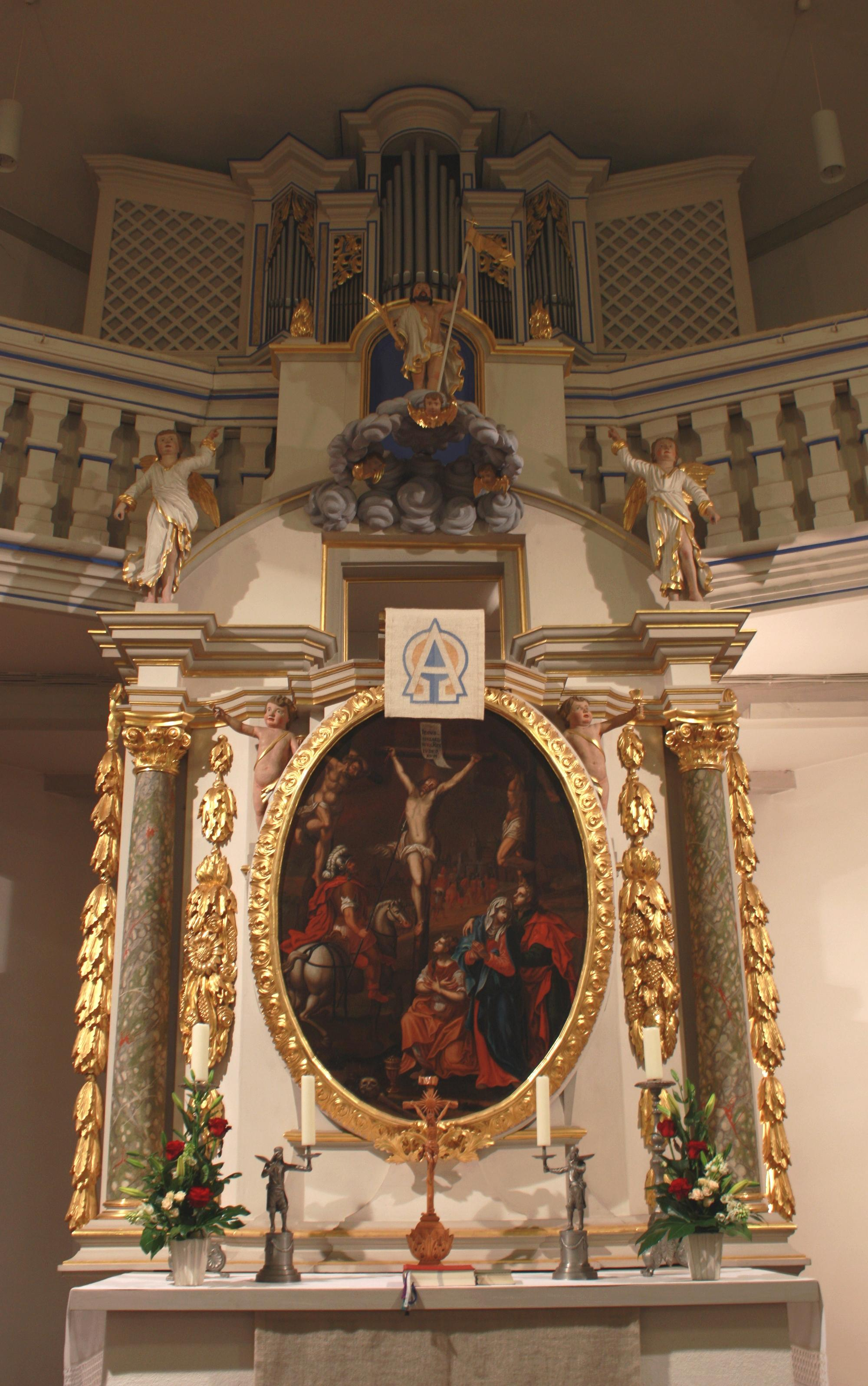
The altar of the church in Crandorf with two tin miner's lights as altar lights in the foreground

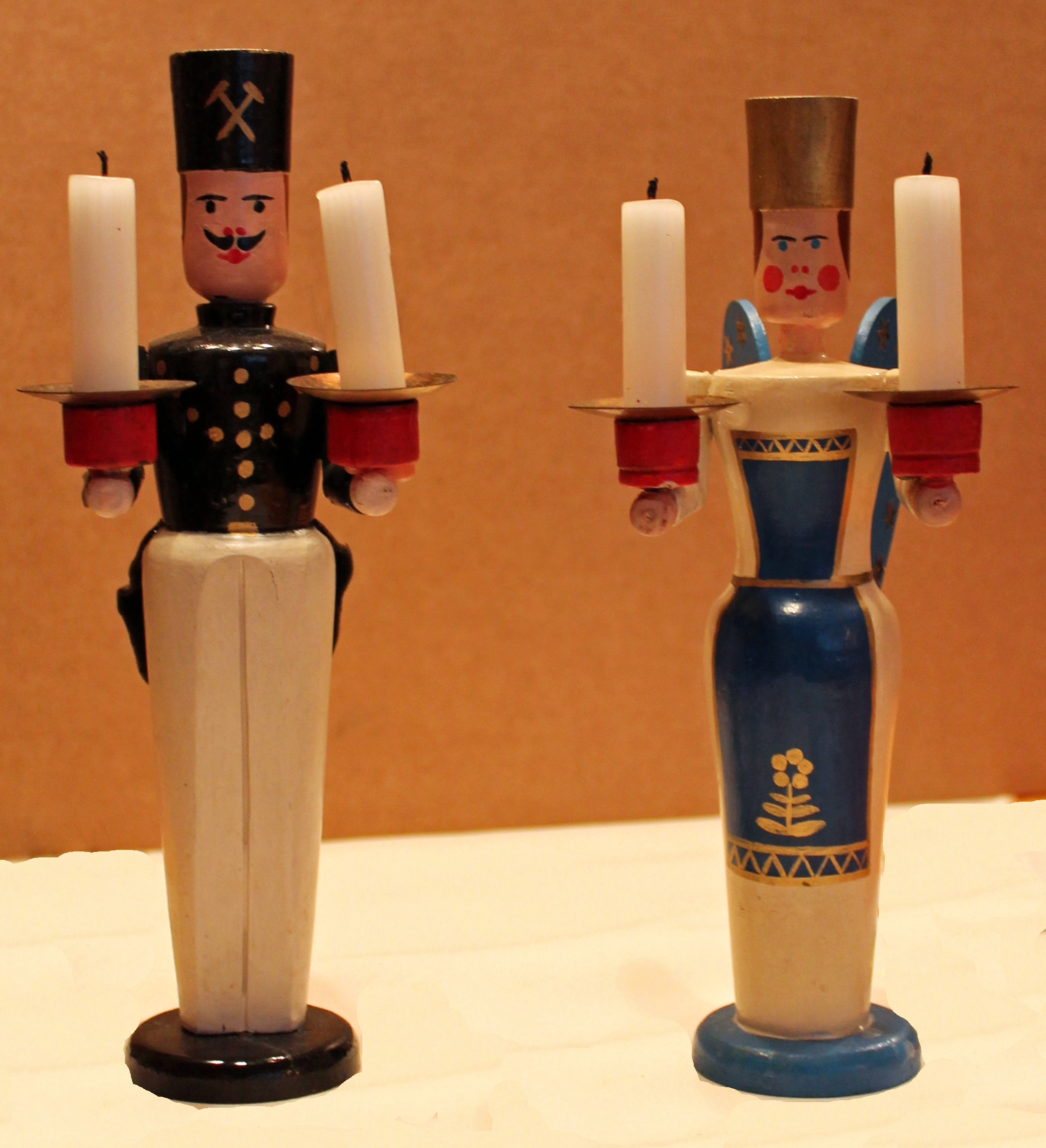
Miner and angel as Christmas light bearers

A miner's figure (German: Bergmannsfigur) is a traditional Christmas decoration from the Ore Mountains of central Europe. Miners' figures are turned or carved out of wood, and often bear two candles. They are usually displayed together with an angelic figure, also bearing a candle. This pair is intended to symbolize the relationship between man and woman or the worldly and spiritual aspects of life.

In the Ore Mountains, miners and angels, together with candle arches, smoking figures and nutcrackers, are all part of Christmas tradition. In modern times, people around the world place these candleholders on windowsills to provide light on long winter nights.

== History ==
Saxony’s Ore Mountain (German: Erzgerbirge) region is one of the closely associated producers of this type of Christmas decoration since the 19th century. Over the years, the Ore Mountains in Germany has become synonymous with high quality Christmas craftsmanship. Mining was the economic driver of this area. However, miners’ hobbies of carving wood from the surrounding forest provided a supplementary income to the Ore Mountain villages and have continued until present.

It was one of the traditional "duties" of every Ore Mountain man, when he became a father, to carve a miner or an angel for his child. The miner for a son and the angel for a daughter.

And at Christmas time, the "fifth season" in the Ore Mountains, these figures were placed in windows and so passers-by could see how many children there were in the house. The figures also had, however, another purpose and thus became a symbol for the region. When miners went to the pit early in the morning, it was still dark, especially in the winter months. Likewise, it was dark in the mine itself and their place of work was only dimly lit. When their long shift was over the moon was already in the sky. In order to light the way for their menfolk in the dark winter's night, the women placed the Light Miner (Lichterbergmann) and the Light Angel (Lichterengel), as the figures were called, in the windows.

The angel became a symbolic figure for the pious mining folk of the Ore Mountains. The angels acted as guardians and light-bearers on the dark and difficult road into the mine. In some versions, the wooden angels holding candles represented miners’ wives waiting for them to get home.
