= Spanbaum =

Handmade tree ornament

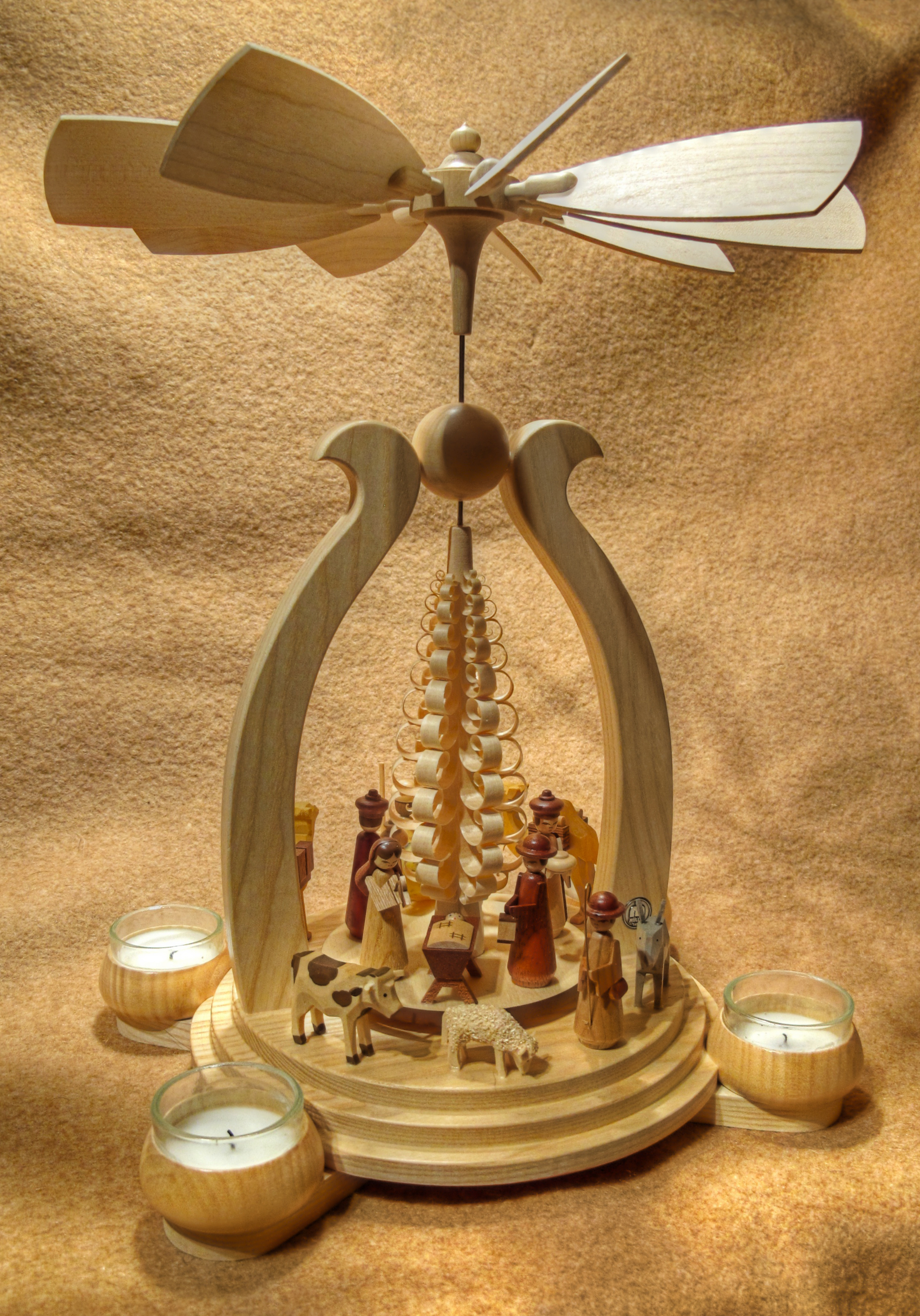
A spanbaum as the central column of a Christmas pyramid

A spanbaum ("wood shaving tree"), variously referred to in English as a hand-shaved tree, wood chip tree or span tree, is a handmade ornamental tree which is usually part of a pyramid ornament. They are mainly manufactured in woodturning workshops in the Ore Mountains of Saxony in eastern Germany. Their method of production is known locally as Spanbaumstechen.

== Material ==
The choice of material is especially important. Only lime wood with a straight grain is suitable.

== Manufacture ==
To make the spanbaum, first of all a conical blank of the tree is turned and a small disc is made for the base. The conical blank is clamped in a vice and the branches carved symmetrically using a chisel, shaving by shaving, on all sides.

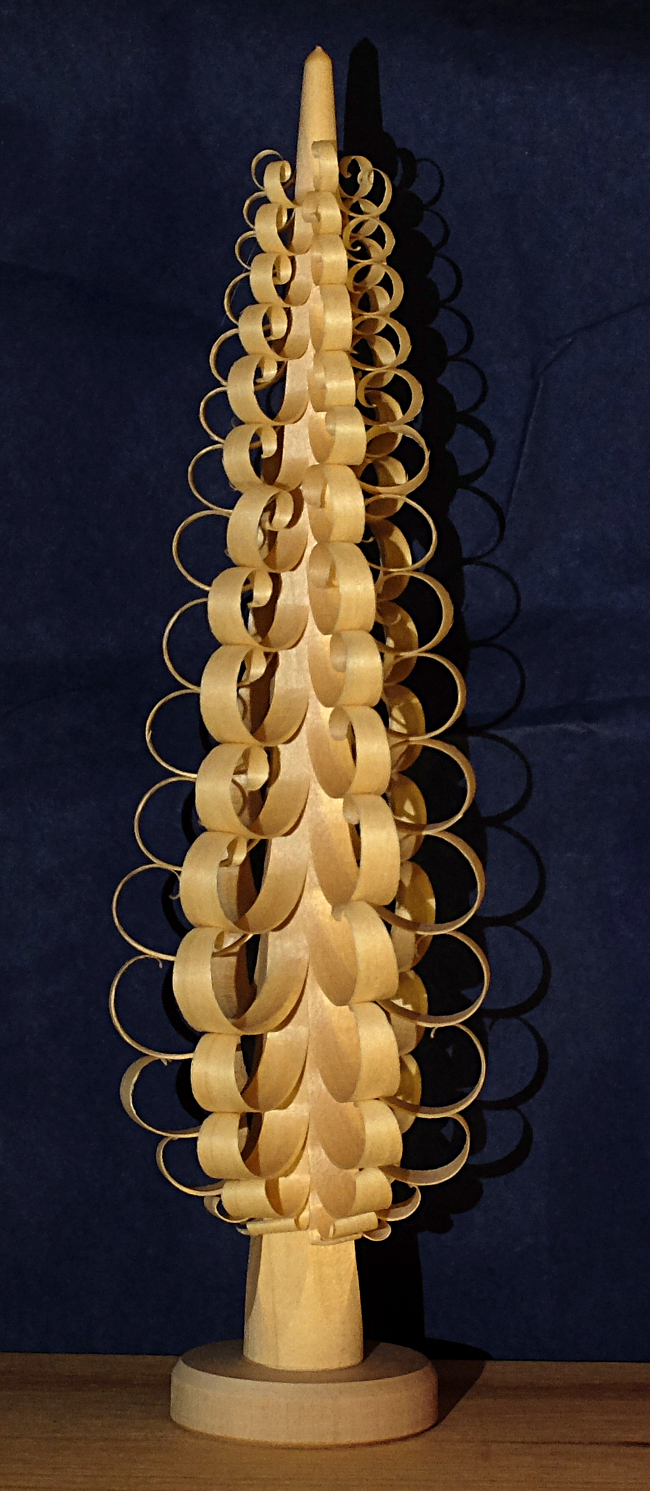
A spanbaum

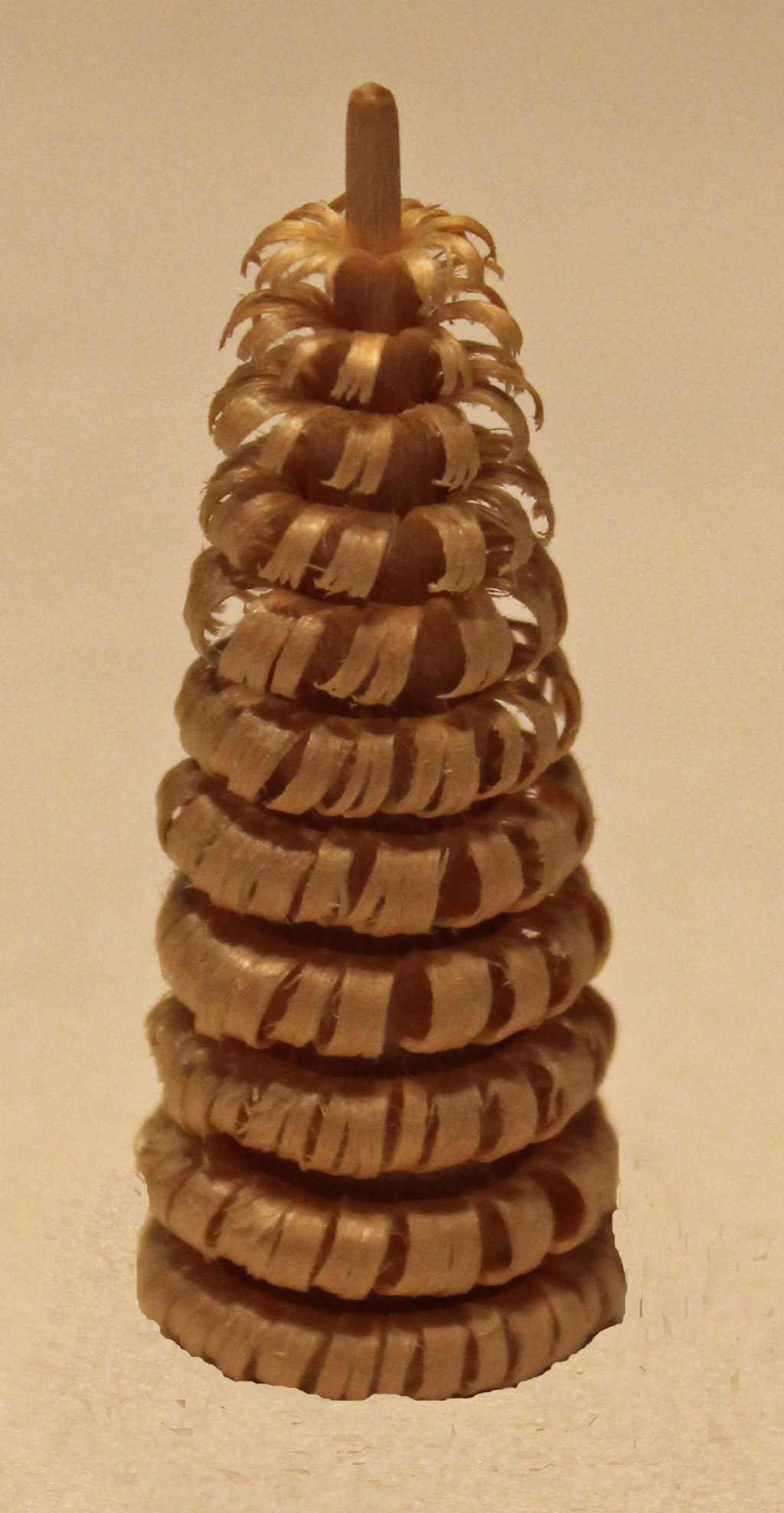
A Kräuselbaum, a type of spanbaum
