= Crottendorf =

- Municipality
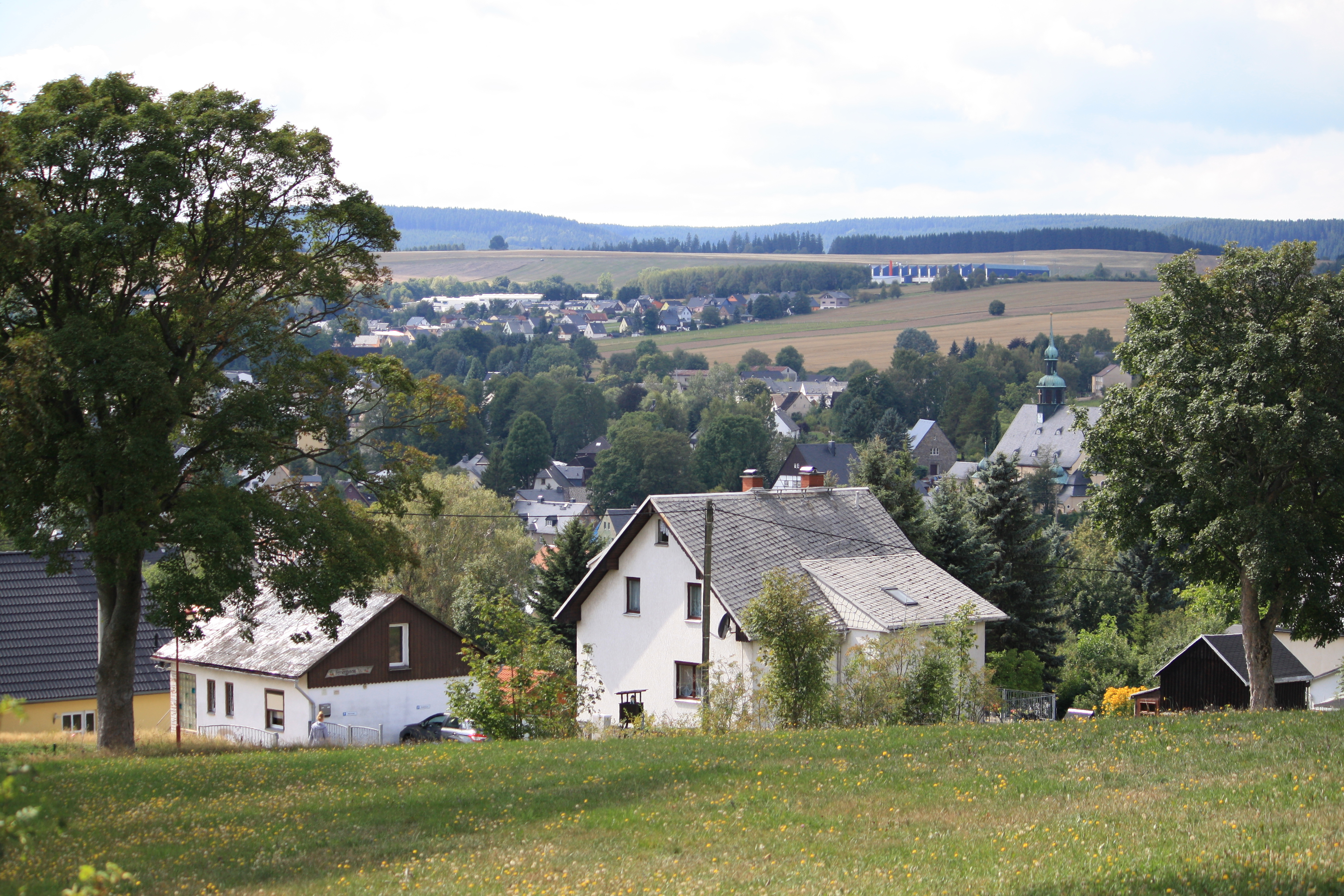
- View from the north

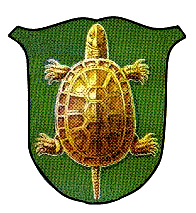
- Coat of arms

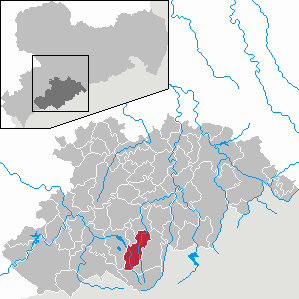
- Location of Crottendorf within Erzgebirgskreis district
- Interactive map of Crottendorf
- Location within Germany Location within Saxony
- Coordinates: 50°31′N 12°57′E
- Country: Germany
- State: Saxony
- District: Erzgebirgskreis
- Subdivisions: 3

Government
  - Mayor (2022–29): Sebastian Martin

Area
  - Total: 36.46 km^{2} (14.08 sq mi)
- Elevation: 650 m (2,130 ft)

Population (2025-12-31)
  - Total: 3,774
  - Density: 103.5/km^{2} (268.1/sq mi)
- Time zone: UTC+01:00 (CET)
  - Summer (DST): UTC+02:00 (CEST)
- Postal codes: 09474
- Dialling codes: 037344
- Vehicle registration: ERZ, ANA, ASZ, AU, MAB, MEK, STL, SZB, ZP

Crottendorf is a municipality that is located in the district of Erzgebirgskreis, in Saxony, Germany.

== History ==
From 1952 to 1990, Crottendorf was part of the Bezirk Karl-Marx-Stadt of East Germany.
