= Horná Štubňa =

- Municipality
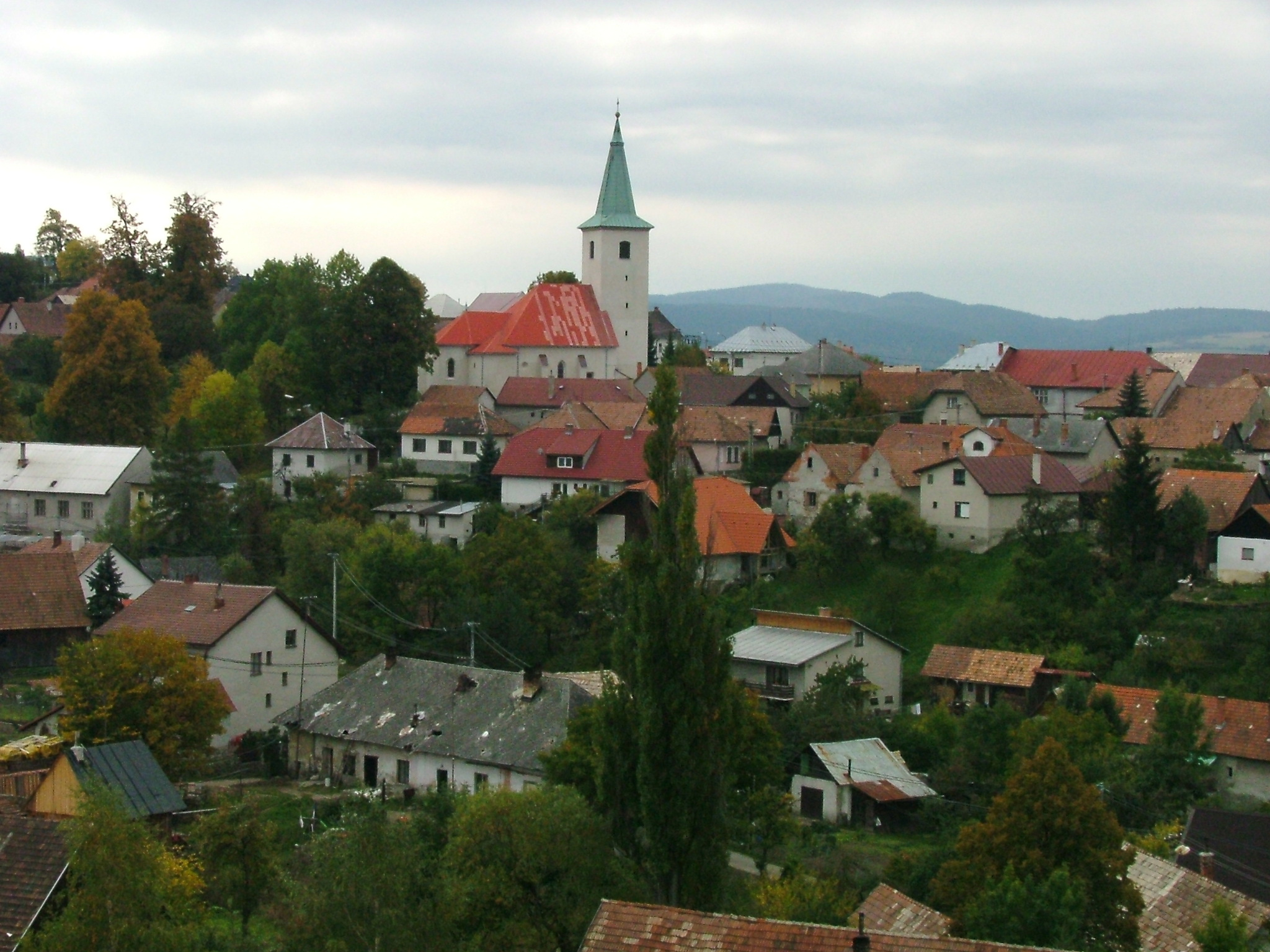

- Flag

- Location of Horná Štubňa in the Žilina Region Location of Horná Štubňa in Slovakia
- Coordinates: 48.82°N 18.88°E
- Country: Slovakia
- Region: Žilina Region
- District: Turčianske Teplice District
- First mentioned: 1390

Area
  - Total: 31.38 km^{2} (12.12 sq mi)
- Elevation: 624 m (2,047 ft)

Population (2025)
  - Total: 1,621
- Time zone: UTC+1 (CET)
  - Summer (DST): UTC+2 (CEST)
- Postal code: 384 6
- Area code: +421 43
- Vehicle registration plate (until 2022): RK
- Website: www.hornastubna.sk

Horná Štubňa (German: Oberstuben; Hungarian: Felsőstubnya) is a village and municipality in Turčianske Teplice District in the Žilina Region of northern central Slovakia.

== History ==
In historical records the village was first mentioned in 1390. Before the establishment of independent Czechoslovakia in 1918, it was part of Turóc County within the Kingdom of Hungary. From 1939 to 1945, it was part of the Slovak Republic. The village belonged to a German language island. The German population was expelled in 1945.

== Geography ==
The municipality lies at an altitude of 624 metres (2,047 ft) and covers an area of 31.38 km^{2} (12.12 sq mi) (2025).

== Population ==
Population statistic (10 years)
Year	1995	2005	2015	2025
Count	1578	1621	1619	1621
Difference		+2.72%	−0.12%	+0.12%

Population statistic
Year	2024	2025
Count	1627	1621
Difference		−0.36%

It has a population of 1621 people (31 December 2025).

=== Ethnicity ===
Census 2021 (1+ %)
Ethnicity	Number	Fraction
Slovak	1519	93.88%
Not found out	88	5.43%
German	50	3.09%
Total	1618	

In year 2021 was 1618 people by ethnicity 1519 as Slovak, 88 as Not found out, 50 as German, 16 as Romani, 3 as Czech, 2 as Hungarian, 2 as Other, 1 as Russian and 1 as Romanian.

Note on population: The difference values of population numbers in the table "Population statistic" and in the sections "Ethnicity" & "Religion" is caused by the use of various statistical methods.

=== Religion ===
Census 2021 (1+ %)
Religion	Number	Fraction
Roman Catholic Church	831	51.36%
None	477	29.48%
Evangelical Church	196	12.11%
Not found out	89	5.5%
Total	1618	

In year 2021 was 1618 people by religion 831 from Roman Catholic Church, 477 from None, 196 from Evangelical Church, 89 from Not found out, 8 from Greek Catholic Church, 3 from Christian Congregations in Slovakia, 3 from Other, 3 from United Methodist Church, 2 from Paganism and natural spirituality, 2 from Ad hoc movements, 1 from Calvinist Church, 1 from Islam, 1 from Hinduism and 1 from Church of Jesus Christ of Latter-day Saints.

== Famous people ==
- Emília Vášáryová, actress

== Genealogical resources ==
The records for genealogical research are available at the state archive "Statny Archiv in Bytca, Slovakia"

- Roman Catholic church records (births/marriages/deaths): 1737-1919 (parish A)
- Lutheran church records (births/marriages/deaths): 1820-1923 (parish B)

== See also ==
- List of municipalities and towns in Slovakia
