= Christmas pyramid =

German Christmas decoration

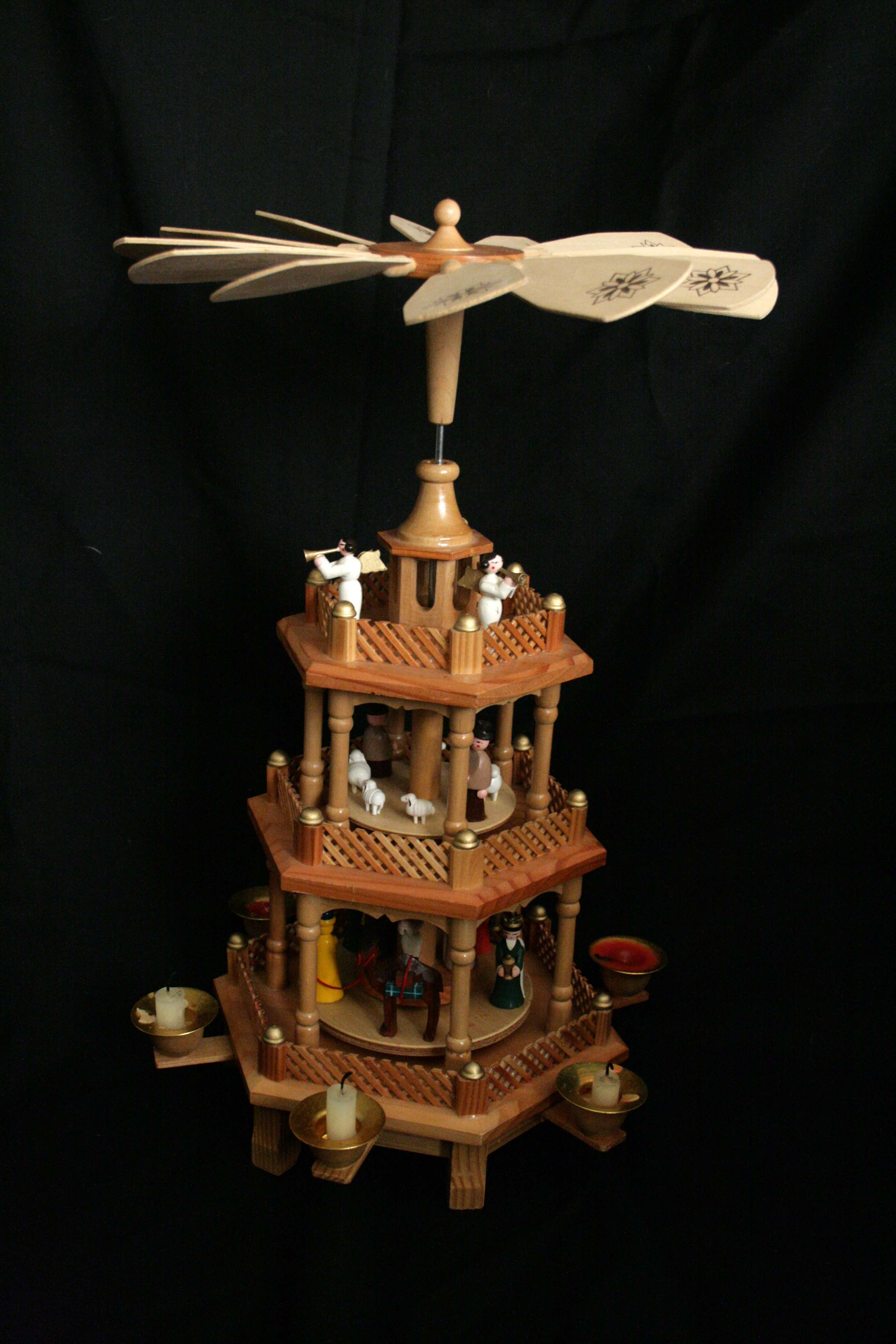
A Christmas pyramid

Christmas pyramids (German: Weihnachtspyramide) are Christmas decorations that have their roots in the folklore and customs of the Ore Mountain region of Germany, but which have become popular internationally. They comprise a decorated pyramidal outer frame with candle holders and a central carousel with a rotor at the top which is driven by warm air from the lit candles. The carousel is decorated with nativity scenes and other Christmas figures such as angels and wise men, as well as worldly motifs such as mining folk and forest scenes.

== Description ==
It is suggested that the Christmas pyramid is a predecessor of the Christmas tree. These pyramids are not limited to Christmas: in the Ore Mountains there was a custom of dancing around the "St. John's Tree", "a pyramid decked with garlands and flowers", at the summer solstice. Not actually pyramid-shaped, the Christmas pyramid is a kind of carousel with several levels, some depicting Christian motifs such as angels or manger scenes, and others with more secular motifs such as mountain-folk, forests, and other scenes from the everyday life of people in the Ore Mountains. The spinning motion of the pyramids is traditionally achieved with the help of candles whose rising heat spins a propeller above.

Generally Christmas pyramids are made of wood and based on four- to eight-sided platforms with a long pole in the middle serving as the axle to which the entire apparatus tapers above and which supports any further platforms. Inside in a glass or ceramic support is a driveshaft on to which at least one platform is attached. The figures, which stand on the platforms are also traditionally made of wood.

Christmas pyramids take various forms from intricately carved miniature houses with pitched roofs, to large multi-level structures that simply serve as a display for the carved figures. In many cities in the Ore Mountains there are large Christmas pyramids on the Market Square at the Christmas market or in other locations associated with Christmas hustle and bustle.

Most of the pyramids demonstrate nativity scenes. They include the story of Jesus Christ being born, of shepherds and wise men visiting the child, and of angels rejoicing in heaven. The nativity scene often is placed on the longest shelf at the bottom of the pyramid, while a pine cone or a star would crown the top.

== History of the Christmas pyramid ==
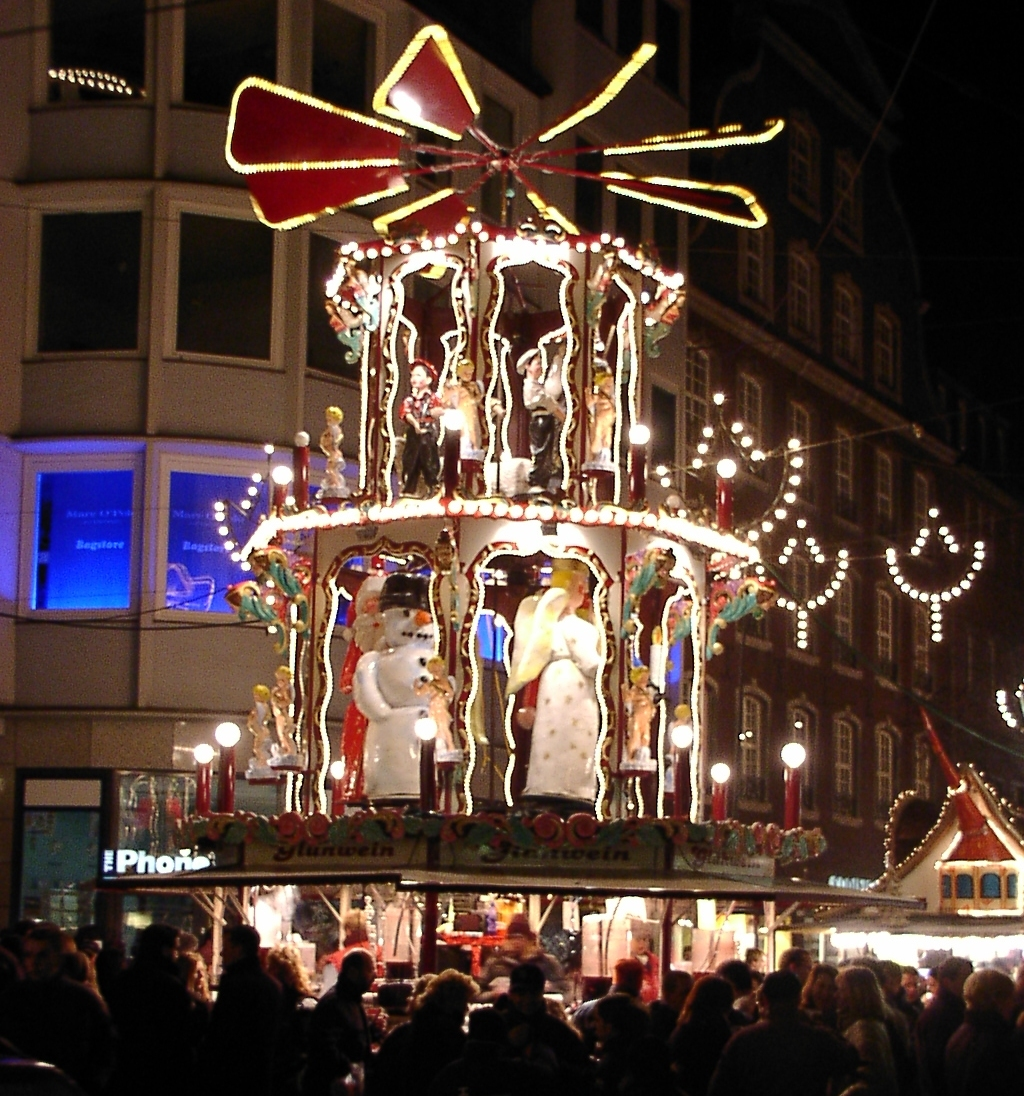
An example at the Christmas market in Düsseldorf

Christmas pyramids were originally hung from the ceiling of German families' houses. The custom spread across Europe, mainly to Italy and England and was brought to America by German immigrants in the 18th century.

The origins of the Christmas pyramids date back to the Middle Ages. In this period it was traditional in southern and western Europe to bring evergreen branches, for example boxwood, into the home and hang them in order to ward off moroseness in the dark and cold winter months. In northern and eastern Europe traditional candles were used to achieve this goal. The Christmas pyramid would eventually unify these two traditions and become a symbol of Christmas celebrations. The forerunner of the pyramid was a construction known as a Lichtergestelle (literally: 'light stand') which were very popular in the 18th century. They were constructions made of four poles, decorated with evergreen boughs, tied together at the top and lit with candles. In the large cities, the Christmas tree, now recognizable all over the world, gradually replaced the Lichtergestelle, but in the mountains, the people did not see a simple tree bedecked with lights; rather they were reminded of the capstans, which were commonly used in the mines of the Ore Mountains. To the pyramid shape was added to the spinning motion of the capstan and the earliest Christmas pyramids were born.

The name Christmas pyramid came about because the Napoleonic campaign in Egypt at the end of the 18th century brought pictures of the pyramids back to Europe and eventually to the Ore Mountains, where they reminded the people of the mining capstans and also of the Christmas constructions.

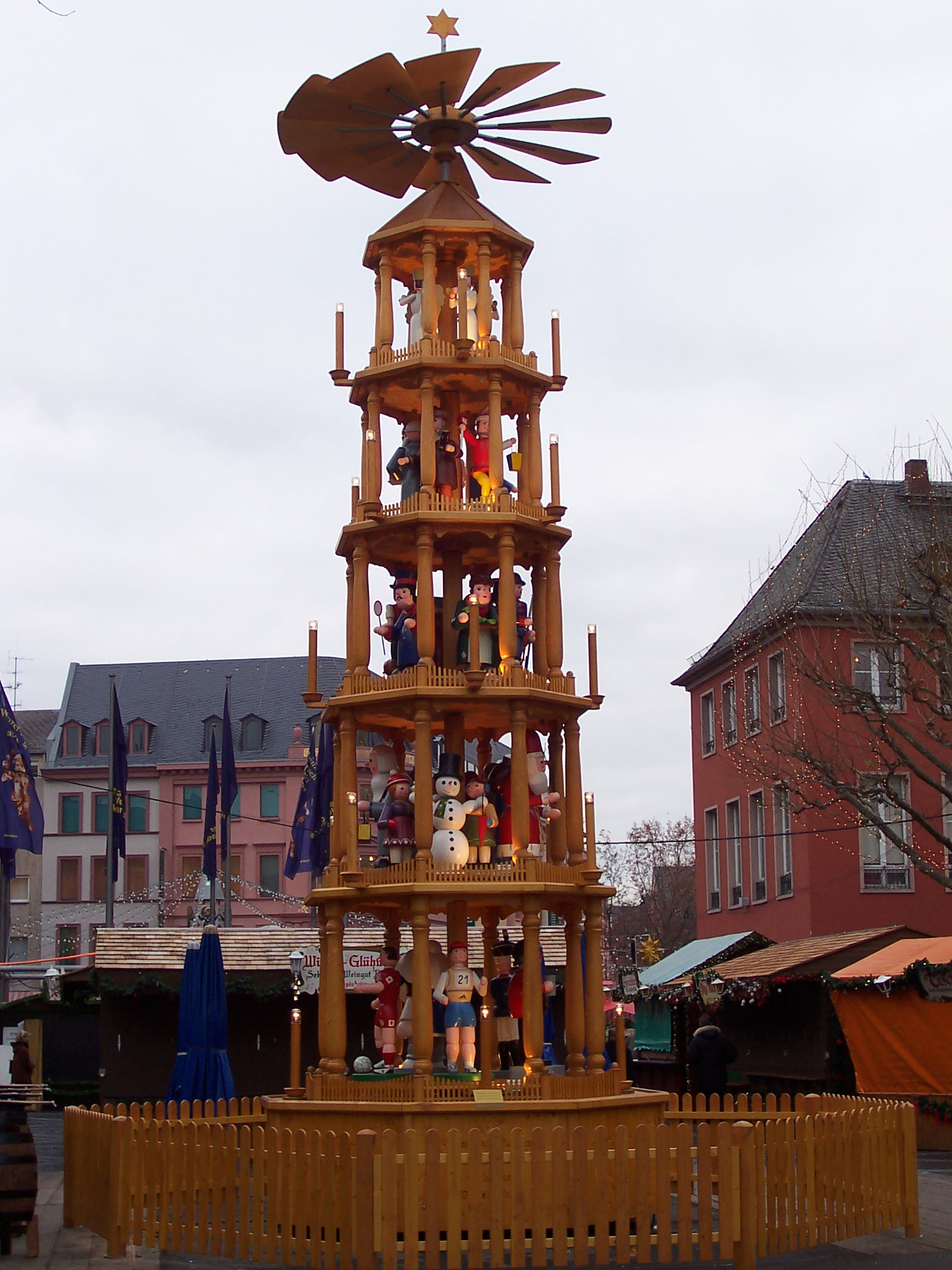
A pyramid at the Christmas market in Mainz

An important breakthrough in the popularity of the Christmas pyramid came around 1830 with the discovery of kerosene. Previously, people had used relatively expensive candles or rapeseed oil. As the means to light and spin the pyramids became much cheaper, the tradition spread. Now such pyramids can be found in numerous styles and sizes all over Germany as well as in many parts of the United States.

== See also ==
- Angel chimes
- Wooden toymaking in the Ore Mountains
