= Saxony =

State in Germany

Free State of Saxony Freistaat Sachsen (German) Freischdaad Saggsn (Upper Saxon) Swobodny stat Sakska (Upper Sorbian)
- State
- Flag Coat of arms
- Anthem: Sachsenlied
- Coordinates: 51°1′37″N 13°21′32″E
- Country: Germany
- Capital: Dresden
- Largest city: Leipzig

Government
  - Body: Landtag of Saxony
  - Minister-President: Michael Kretschmer (CDU)
  - Governing parties: CDU / SPD
  - Bundesrat votes: 4 (of 69)
  - Bundestag seats: 30 (of 630) (as of 2025)

Area
  - Total: 18,449.89 km^{2} (7,123.54 sq mi)

Population (2023)
  - Total: 4,089,467
  - Density: 221.6526/km^{2} (574.0777/sq mi)
- Demonym: Saxon

GDP
  - Total: €167.973 billion (2025)
  - Per capita: €41,553 (2025)
- Time zone: UTC+1 (CET)
  - Summer (DST): UTC+2 (CEST)
- ISO 3166 code: DE-SN
- NUTS Region: DED
- HDI (2022): 0.944 very high · 8th of 16
- Website: www.sachsen.de/en/

Saxony, (Note: German: Sachsen [ˈzaksn̩]; Upper Saxon: Saggsn; Upper Sorbian: Sakska) officially the Free State of Saxony, (Note: German: Freistaat Sachsen [ˈfʁaɪʃtaːt ˈzaksn̩]; Upper Saxon: Freischdaad Saggsn; Upper Sorbian: Swobodny stat Sakska [ˈswɔbɔdnɨ ˈstat ˈsakska]) is a landlocked state of Germany, bordering the states of Brandenburg, Saxony-Anhalt, Thuringia, and Bavaria, as well as the countries of the Czechia and Poland. Its capital is Dresden, and its largest city is Leipzig. Saxony is the tenth largest of Germany's sixteen states, with an area of 18,450 square kilometres (7,124 sq mi), and the seventh most populous, with more than 4 million inhabitants. Together with Saxony-Anhalt and Thuringia, Saxony is one of the three states commonly associated with Central Germany.

The present-day state takes its name from the historic Electorate of Saxony and Kingdom of Saxony, though its territory represents only part of their former extent. Ruled for centuries by the House of Wettin, Saxony was among the most influential states of the Holy Roman Empire. It played a prominent role during the Protestant Reformation, particularly under Frederick the Wise, and later emerged as a major political and cultural centre within the German-speaking lands. After the Congress of Vienna in 1815, the kingdom ceded much of its territory to Prussia, establishing boundaries that broadly shaped the modern state.

During the 19th century, Saxony became one of the most densely industrialised regions in Europe, with major textile, engineering, and manufacturing industries. Following the Second World War, it formed part of the Soviet occupation zone in Germany and later the German Democratic Republic. The state was abolished in 1952 during administrative reforms in East Germany and re-established upon German reunification in 1990.

Saxony is noted for its historic towns and cities, long industrial tradition, and cultural institutions. Dresden's Baroque cityscape and art collections, Leipzig's musical traditions, and the Ore Mountains' mining heritage are among its most prominent cultural features. The state's economy is centred on manufacturing, particularly in the automotive, microelectronics, and mechanical engineering sectors. It is also home to several universities and research institutes.

== History ==
Saxony has a long history as a duchy, an electorate of the Holy Roman Empire (the Electorate of Saxony), and finally as a kingdom. In 1918, after Germany's defeat in World War I, its monarchy was overthrown and a republican form of government was established under the current name. The state was broken up into smaller units during communist rule (1949–1989), but was re-established on 3 October 1990 on the reunification of East and West Germany.

=== Prehistory ===
In prehistoric times, the territory of present-day Saxony was the site of some of the largest of the ancient central European monumental temples, dating from the fifth millennium BC. Notable archaeological sites have been discovered in Dresden and the villages of Eythra and Zwenkau near Leipzig. The Germanic presence in the territory of today's Saxony is thought to have begun in the first century BC.

Parts of Saxony were possibly under the control of the Germanic King Marobod during the Roman empire era. By the late Roman period, several tribes known as the Saxons emerged, from which the subsequent state(s) draw their name.

=== Stem Duchy of Saxony ===
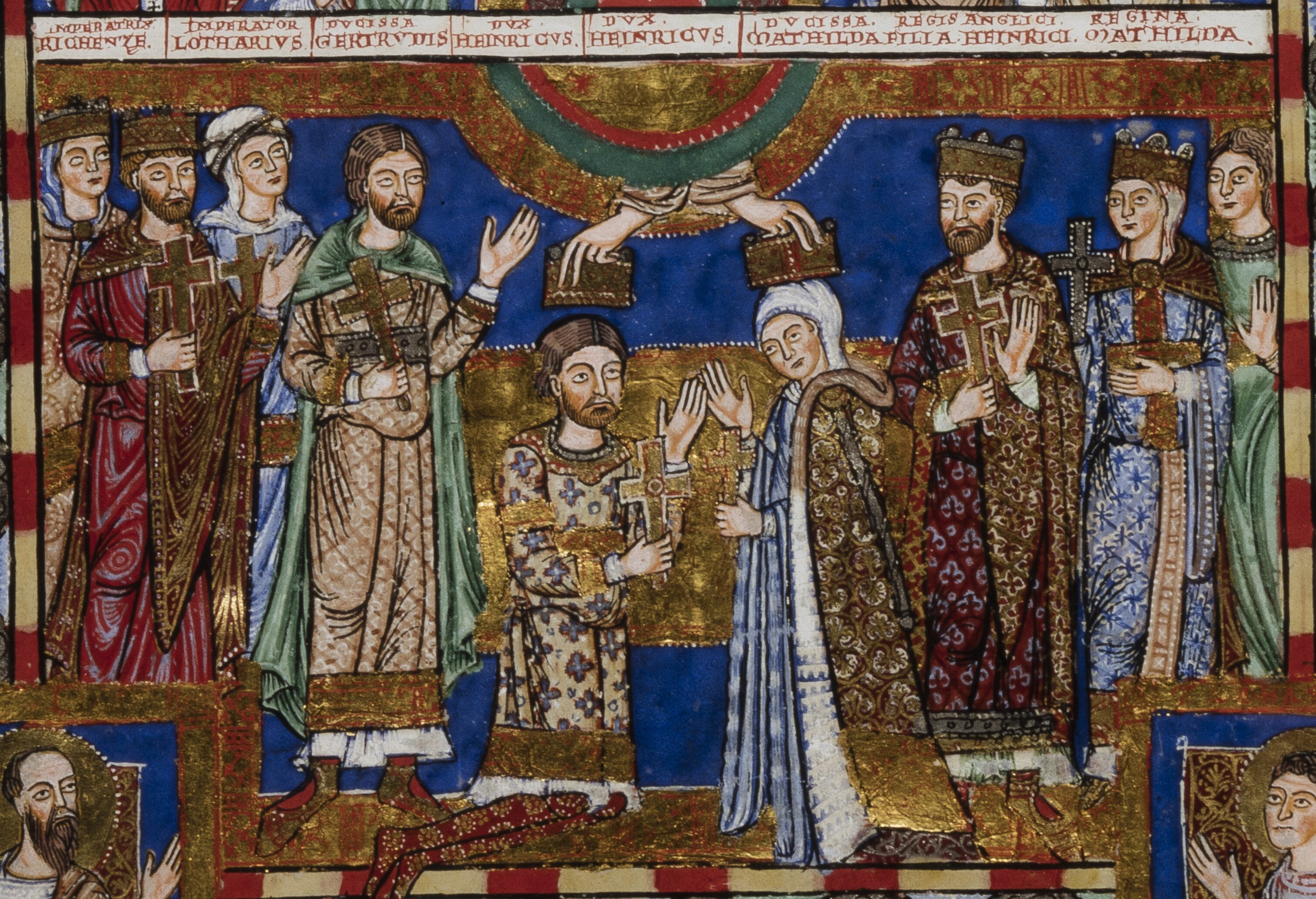
Henry the Lion (with his wife Matilda of England, Duchess of Saxony) being crowned as the Duke of Saxony

Since the late 6th century, the territory of modern-day Saxony and parts of Thuringia was populated by Polabian Slavs, most prominently the Sorbs. It was conquered by Francia and subsequently organized as the Sorbian March. A legacy of this period is the modern ethnic group of Sorbs in Saxony. Eastern and western parts of present Saxony were ruled by Bohemia at various times between 1075 and 1635 (with some intermissions), and Schirgiswalde (Upper Sorbian: Šěrachów; Czech: Šerachov) remained a Bohemian exclave until 1809. Eastern parts were also ruled by Poland between 1002 and 1032, by the Duchy of Jawor, the southwesternmost duchy of fragmented Piast-ruled Poland, from 1319 to 1346, and by Hungary from 1469 to 1490, and Pechern (Upper Sorbian: Pěchč) was part of the Duchy of Żagań, one of the Lower Silesian duchies formed in the course of the medieval fragmentation of Poland, remaining under the Piast dynasty until 1472.

The first medieval Duchy of Saxony was a late Early Middle Ages "Carolingian stem duchy", which emerged around the start of the 8th century AD and grew to include the greater part of Northern Germany, what are now the modern German states of Bremen, Hamburg, Lower Saxony, North Rhine-Westphalia, Schleswig-Holstein and Saxony-Anhalt. Saxons converted to Christianity during this period, with Charlemagne outlawing pagan practices. This geographical region is unrelated to present-day Saxony but the name moved southwards due to certain historical events (see below).

=== Holy Roman Empire ===
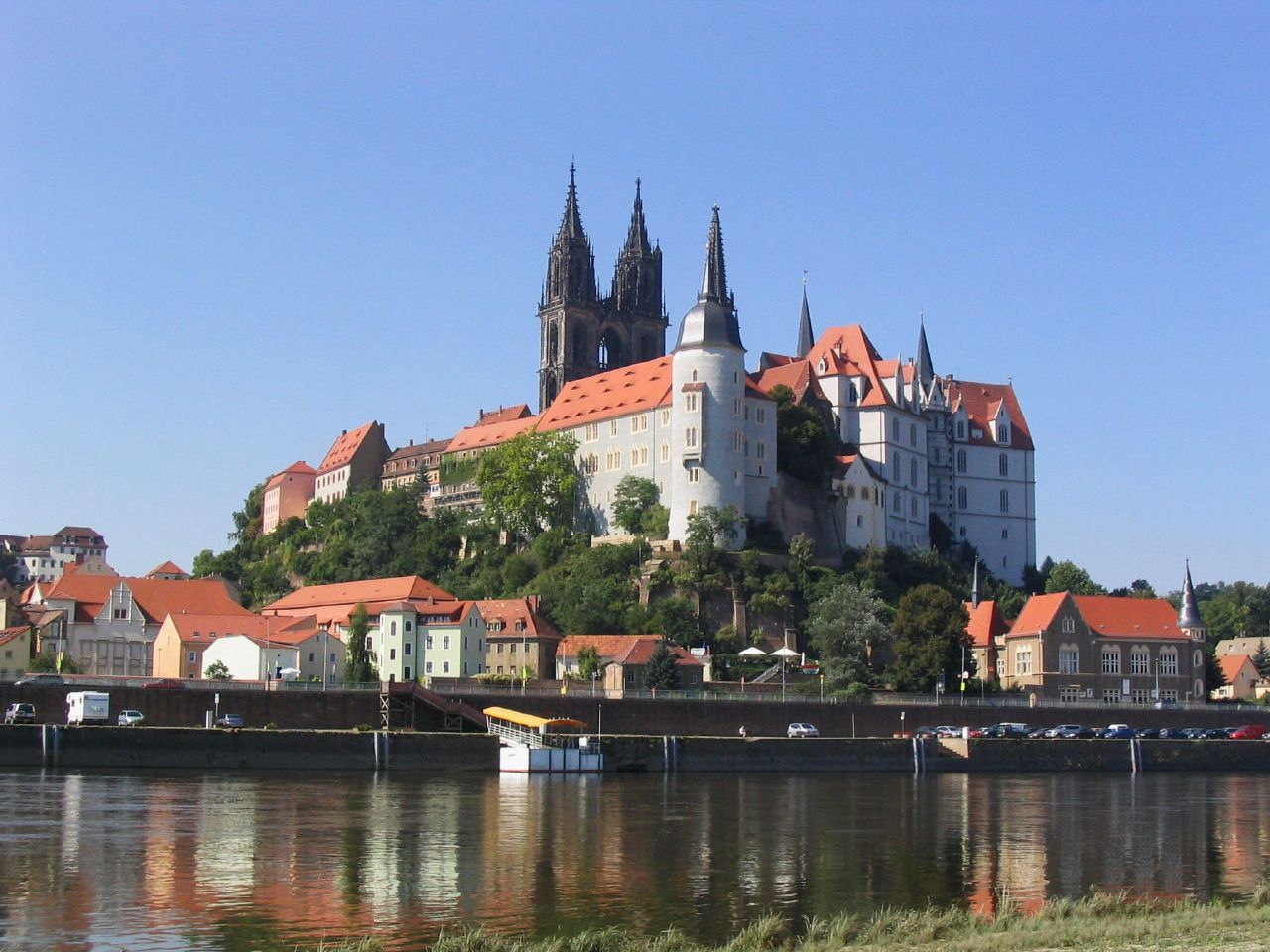
Meissen, with Albrechtsburg and Cathedral

The territory of the Free State of Saxony became part of the Holy Roman Empire by the 10th century, when the dukes of Saxony were also kings (or emperors) of the Holy Roman Empire, comprising the Ottonian, or Saxon, dynasty. The Margravate of Meissen was founded in 985 as a frontier march, that soon extended to the Kwisa (Queis) river to the east and as far as the Ore Mountains. In the process of Ostsiedlung, settlement of German farmers in the sparsely populated area was promoted. Around this time, the Billungs, a Saxon noble family, received extensive lands in Saxony. The emperor eventually gave them the title of dukes of Saxony. After Duke Magnus died in 1106, causing the extinction of the male line of Billungs, oversight of the duchy was given to Lothar of Supplinburg, who also became emperor for a short time.

In 1137, control of Saxony passed to the Guelph dynasty, descendants of Wulfhild Billung, eldest daughter of the last Billung duke, and the daughter of Lothar of Supplinburg. In 1180 large portions west of the Weser were ceded to the Bishops of Cologne, while some central parts between the Weser and the Elbe remained with the Guelphs, becoming later the Duchy of Brunswick-Lüneburg. The remaining eastern lands, together with the title of Duke of Saxony, passed to an Ascanian dynasty (descended from Eilika Billung, Wulfhild's younger sister) and were divided in 1260 into the two small states of Saxe-Lauenburg and Saxe-Wittenberg. The former state was also named Lower Saxony, the latter Upper Saxony, thence the later names of the two Imperial Circles Saxe-Lauenburg and Saxe-Wittenberg. Both claimed the Saxon electoral privilege for themselves, but the Golden Bull of 1356 accepted only Wittenberg's claim, with Lauenburg nevertheless continuing to maintain its claim. In 1422, when the Saxon electoral line of the Ascanians became extinct, the Ascanian Eric V of Saxe-Lauenburg tried to reunite the Saxon duchies.

However, Sigismund, King of the Romans, had already granted Margrave Frederick IV the Warlike of Meissen (House of Wettin) an expectancy of the Saxon electorate in order to remunerate his military support. On 1 August 1425 Sigismund enfeoffed the Wettinian Frederick as Prince-Elector of Saxony, despite the protests of Eric V. Thus the Saxon territories remained permanently separated.

The Electorate of Saxony was then merged with the much larger Wettinian Margraviate of Meissen; however, it used the higher-ranking title Electorate of Saxony and even the Ascanian coat-of-arms for the entire monarchy. Thus Saxony came to include Dresden and Meissen. Hence, the territory of the modern Free State of Saxony shares the name with the old Saxon stem duchy for historical and dynastic reasons rather than any significant ethnic, linguistic or cultural connection. In the 18th and 19th centuries Saxe-Lauenburg was colloquially called the Duchy of Lauenburg, which was held in a personal union by the Electorate of Hanover from the 18th century to the Napoleonic wars, and in a personal union with Denmark (along with neighbouring Holstein and Schleswig) for much the 19th century. In 1876 it was absorbed into Prussia as the Duchy of Lauenburg district of the Province of Schleswig-Holstein).

=== Foundation of the second Saxon state ===
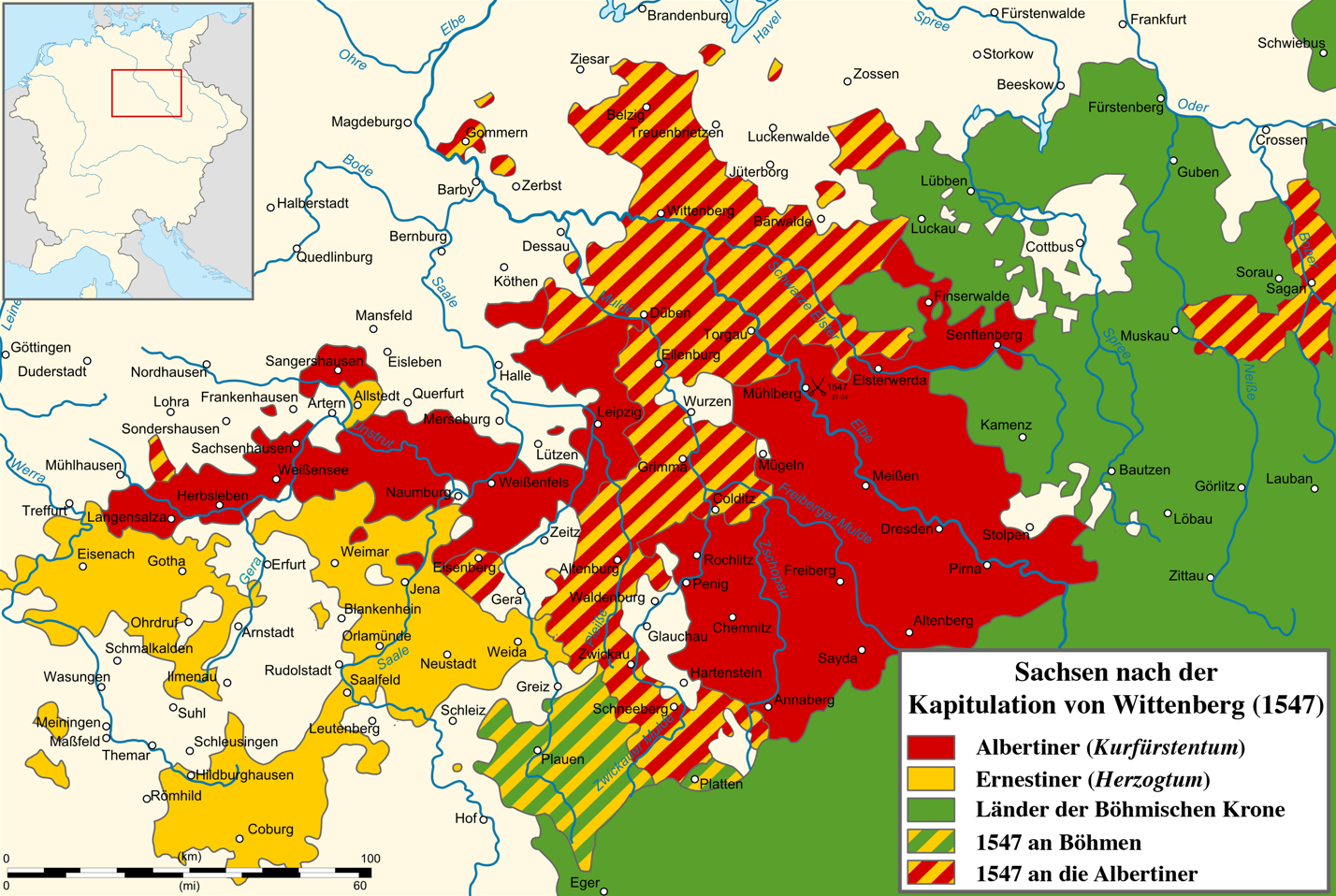
Redistribution of Wettin lands upon the Capitulation of Wittenberg (1547)

Saxe-Wittenberg, mostly in modern Saxony-Anhalt, became subject to the margravate of Meissen, ruled by the Wettin dynasty in 1423. This established a new and powerful state, occupying large portions of the present Free State of Saxony, Thuringia, Saxony-Anhalt and Bavaria (Coburg and its environs). Although the centre of this state was far to the southeast of the former Saxony, it came to be referred to as Upper Saxony and then simply Saxony, while the former Saxon territories in the north were now known as Lower Saxony (the modern term Niedersachsen deriving from this).

In 1485, Saxony was split in the Treaty of Leipzig. Ernest kept the Saxon electoral title (attached to the Duchy of Saxe-Wittenberg) and several domains in southern parts of Thuringia. The territories in Thuringia later developed into the Ernestine duchies. Since these princes were allowed to use the Saxon coat of arms, in many towns of Thuringia, the coat of arms can still be found in historical buildings. Albert received the Saxon ducal title and rule over the old Margraviate of Meissen, together with various domains in northern parts of Thuringia. He established Dresden as the capital of the newly established Duchy of Saxony.

Following the Imperial reform of 1500, both the Electorate and the Duchy of Saxony became part of the Saxon Circle of the Holy Roman Empire, and after the division of that circle in 1512 formed part of the Upper Saxon Circle.

As a result of the Capitulation of Wittenberg, the Electorate of Saxony and its core territory (the Duchy of Saxe-Wittenberg) passed from the elder Ernestine branch of the Saxon ruling House of Wettin, to the cadet Albertine branch, headed by duke Maurice, Duke of Saxony, who became the first Saxon prince-elector from the Albertine line.

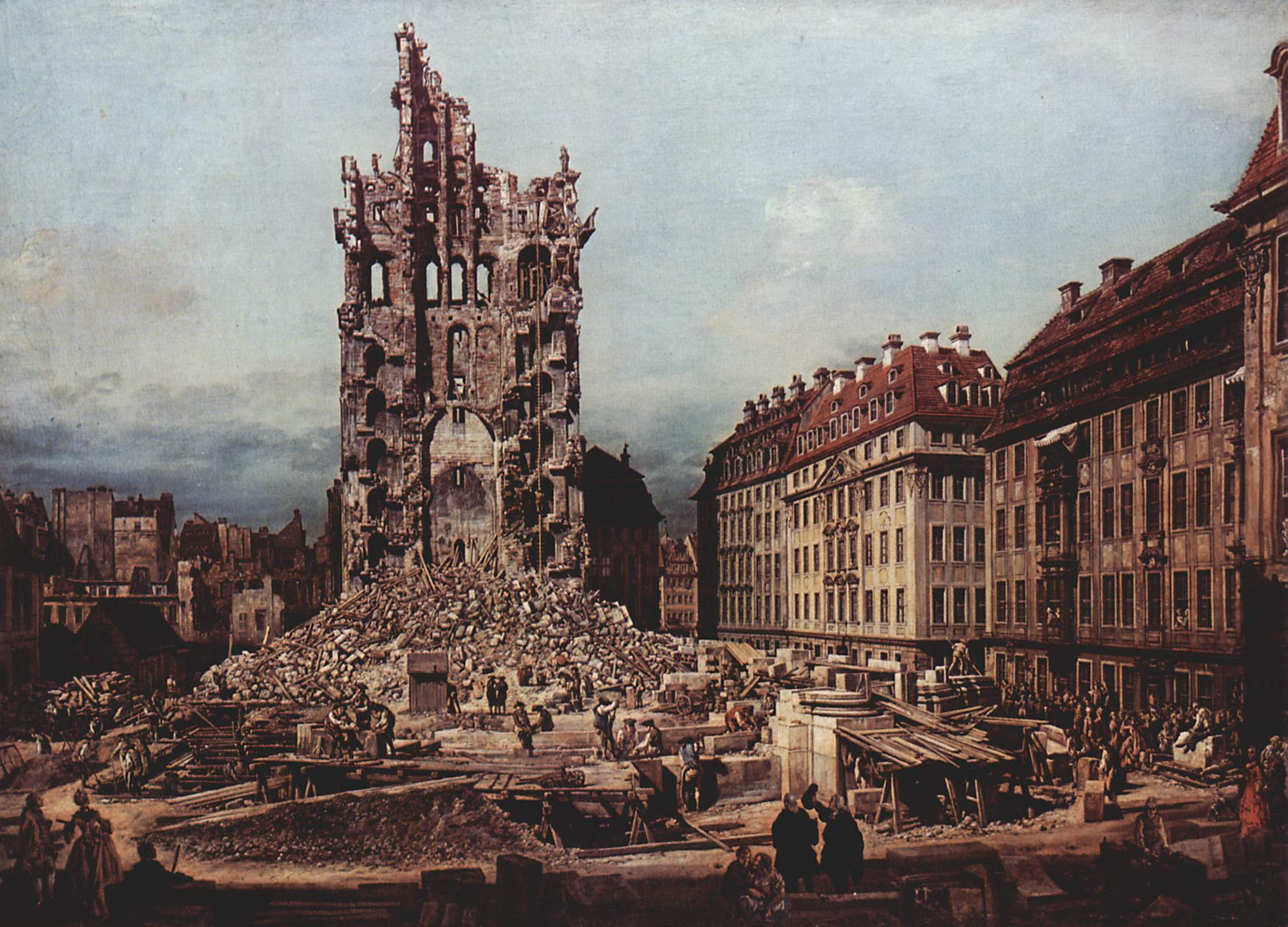
Depiction of the ruins of Dresden's Kreuzkirche following its destruction by Prussian artillery during the Seven Years' War (Canaletto, 1765)

In the 17th century, the Electorate of Saxony grew even more powerful, receiving Upper and Lower Lusatia in the Peace of Prague (1635). It also became known in the 18th century for its cultural achievements, although it was politically weaker than Prussia and Austria, states which oppressed Saxony from the north and south, respectively.

Between 1697 and 1763, two successive Electors of Saxony were also elected Kings of Poland in personal union. Many landmarks in Saxony date from this period and contain remnants of the former close Polish-Saxon relation, such as the coat of arms of the Polish–Lithuanian Commonwealth on the facades and in the interiors of palaces, churches, edifices, etc. (e.g. Zwinger, Dresden Cathedral, Moritzburg Castle), and on numerous mileposts, and the close political and cultural relationship persisted well into the 19th century, with Saxony being the place of preparations for the Polish Kościuszko Uprising against the partitioning powers, and one of the chief destinations for Polish refugees from partitioned Poland, including the artistic and political elite, such as composer Frédéric Chopin, war hero Józef Bem and writer Adam Mickiewicz.

In 1756, Saxony joined a coalition of Austria, France and Russia against Prussia. Frederick II of Prussia chose to attack preemptively and invaded Saxony in August 1756, precipitating the Third Silesian War (part of the Seven Years' War). The Prussians quickly defeated Saxony and incorporated the Saxon army into the Prussian Army. At the end of the Seven Years' War, Saxony recovered its independence in the 1763 Treaty of Hubertusburg.

=== 19th century ===
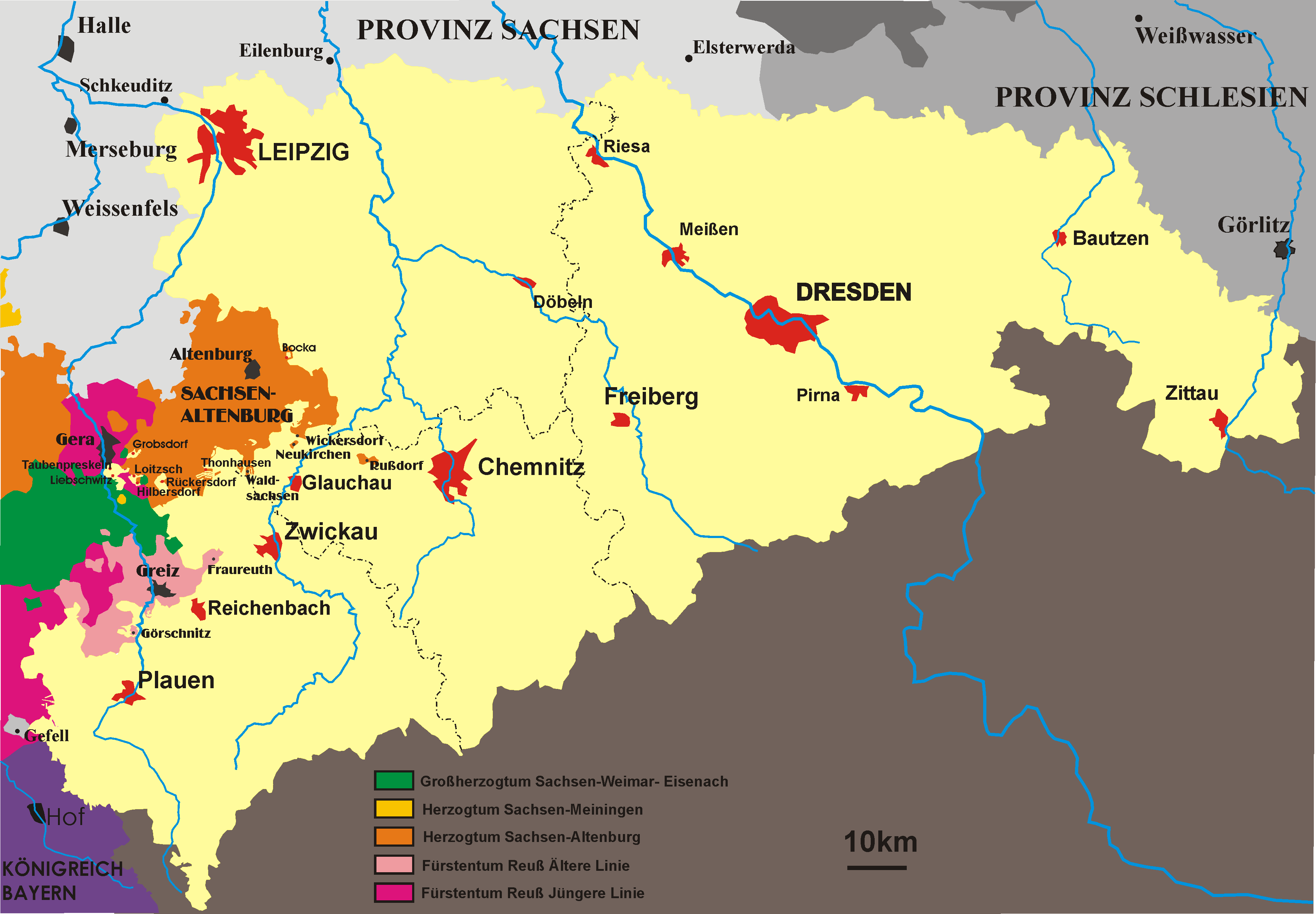
The Kingdom of Saxony after the Congress of Vienna

In 1806, French Emperor Napoleon abolished the Holy Roman Empire and established the Electorate of Saxony as a kingdom in exchange for military support. The Elector Frederick Augustus III accordingly became King Frederick Augustus I of Saxony. Frederick Augustus remained loyal to Napoleon during the wars that swept Europe in the following years; he was taken prisoner and his territories were declared forfeit by the allies in 1813, after the defeat of Napoleon. Prussia intended the annexation of Saxony but the opposition of Austria, France, and the United Kingdom to this plan resulted in the restoration of Frederick Augustus to his throne at the Congress of Vienna although he was forced to cede the northern part of the kingdom to Prussia, which led to the loss of nearly 60% of the Saxon territory, and 40% of its population. Most of these lands were merged with the Duchy of Magdeburg, the Altmark and some smaller territories to become the Prussian Province of Saxony, a predecessor of the modern state of Saxony-Anhalt. Lower Lusatia and part of the former Saxe-Wittenberg territory became part of the Province of Brandenburg and the northeastern part of Upper Lusatia became part of the Province of Silesia. The rump Kingdom of Saxony had roughly the same extent as the present state, albeit slightly smaller.

Meanwhile, in 1815, the Kingdom of Saxony joined the German Confederation. In the politics of the Confederation, Saxony was overshadowed by Prussia and Austria. King Anthony of Saxony came to the throne of Saxony in 1827. Shortly thereafter, liberal pressures in Saxony mounted and broke out in revolt during 1830—a year of revolution in Europe. The revolution in Saxony resulted in a constitution for the Kingdom of Saxony that served as the basis for its government until 1918.

During the 1848–49 constitutionalist revolutions in Germany, Saxony became a hotbed of revolutionaries, with anarchists such as Mikhail Bakunin and democrats including Richard Wagner and Gottfried Semper taking part in the May Uprising in Dresden in 1849. The May uprising in Dresden forced King Frederick Augustus II of Saxony to concede further reforms to the Saxon government.

In 1854 Frederick Augustus II's brother, King John of Saxony, succeeded to the throne. A scholar, King John translated Dante. King John followed a federalistic and pro-Austrian policy throughout the early 1860s until the outbreak of the Austro-Prussian War. During that war, Prussian troops overran Saxony without resistance and then invaded Austrian Bohemia. After the war, Saxony was forced to pay an indemnity and to join the North German Confederation in 1867. Under the terms of the North German Confederation, Prussia took over control of the Saxon postal system, railroads, military and foreign affairs. In the Franco-Prussian War of 1870, Saxon troops fought together with Prussian and other German troops against France. In 1871, Saxony joined the newly formed German Empire.

Saxony ranked as the most industrialised state in Europe by 1871, second only to Belgium. Census figures from that year recorded 52% of the population employed in industry and crafts and 10% in trade and transportation, with agriculture accounting for just 16%. The fifth largest state of the German Empire by area and third by population, it was the most densely populated state in Europe.

=== 20th century ===
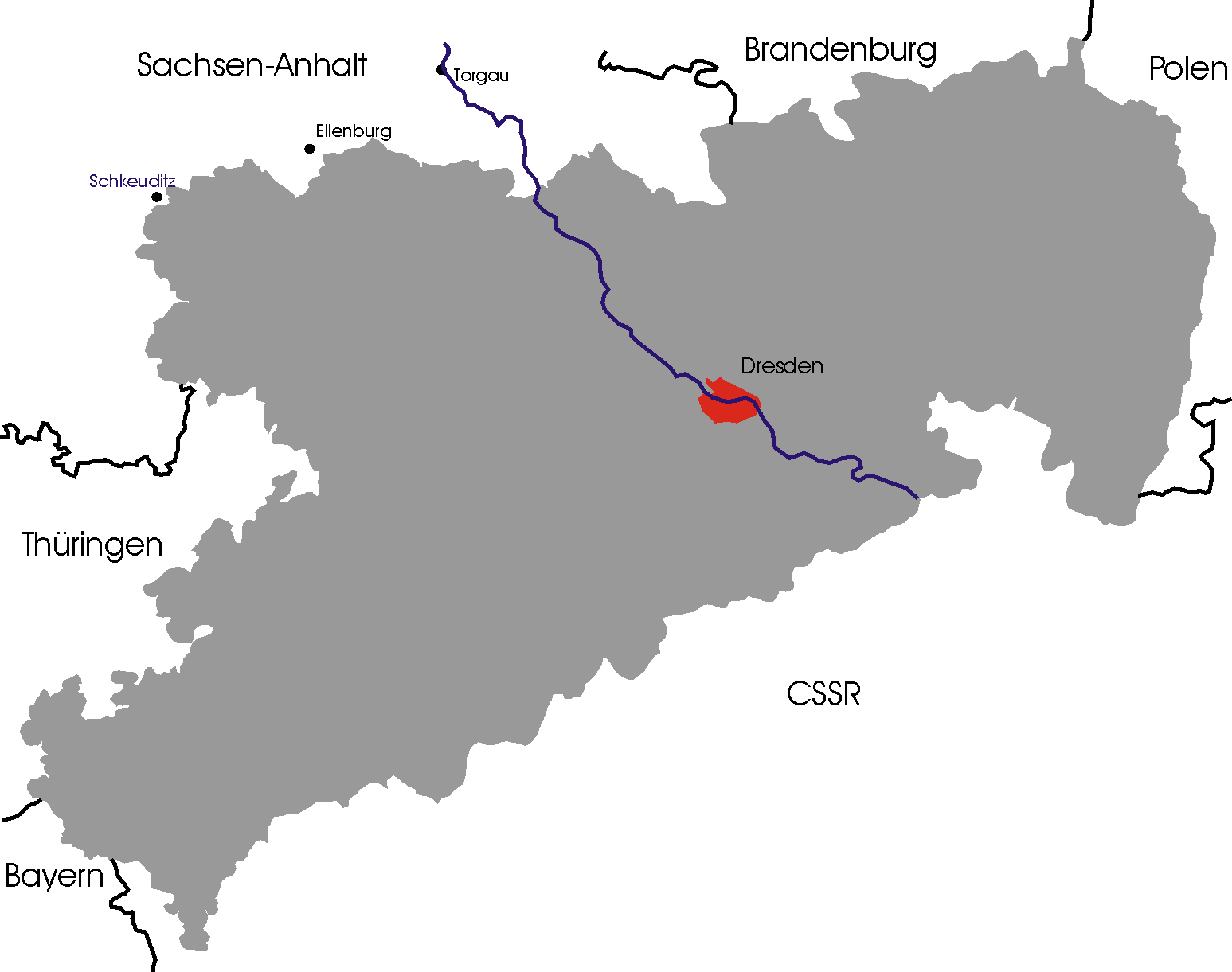
The Free State of Saxony 1945–1952

After King Frederick Augustus III of Saxony abdicated on 13 November 1918, Saxony, remaining a constituent state of Germany (Weimar Republic), became the Free State of Saxony under a new constitution enacted on 1 November 1920. In October 1923, when the Communist Party of Germany entered the Social Democratic-led government in Dresden with hidden revolutionary intentions, the Reich government under Chancellor Gustav Stresemann used a Reichsexekution to send troops into Saxony to remove the Communists from the government. The state retained its name and borders during the Nazi era as a Gau (Gau Saxony), but lost its quasi-autonomous status and its parliamentary democracy.

During World War II, under the secret Nazi programme Aktion T4, an estimated 15,000 people suffering from mental and physical disabilities, as well as a number of concentration camp inmates, were murdered at Sonnenstein killing centre near Pirna. Numerous subcamps of the Buchenwald, Flossenburg and Gross-Rosen concentration camps were operated in Saxony.

The State of Saxony within the Soviet occupation zone in Germany and later the German Democratic Republic. (1945–1952)

As the war drew to its end, U.S. troops under General George Patton occupied the western part of Saxony in April 1945, while Soviet troops occupied the eastern part. That summer, the entire state was handed over to Soviet forces as agreed in the London Protocol of September 1944. Britain, the US, and the USSR then negotiated Germany's future at the Potsdam Conference. Under the Potsdam Agreement, all German territory East of the Oder-Neisse line was annexed by Poland and the Soviet Union. During the following three years, Poland and Czechoslovakia expelled German-speaking people from their territories, and some of these expellees came to Saxony. Only a small area of Saxony lying east of the Neisse River and centred around the town of Reichenau (Bogatynia) was annexed by Poland.

Part of the former Prussian province of Lower Silesia lay west of the Oder-Neisse line and therefore was separated from the bulk of its former province; the Soviet Military Administration in Germany (SVAG) merged this territory into Saxony. This former Silesian territory broadly corresponded with the Upper Lusatian territory annexed by Prussia in 1815.

On 20 October 1946, SVAG organised elections for the Saxon state parliament (Landtag), but many people were arbitrarily excluded from candidacy and suffrage, and the Soviet Union openly supported the Socialist Unity Party of Germany (SED). The new minister-president Rudolf Friedrichs (SED), had been a member of the SPD until April 1946. He met his Bavarian counterparts in the U.S. zone of occupation in October 1946 and May 1947, but died suddenly in mysterious circumstances the following month. He was succeeded by Max Seydewitz, a loyal follower of Joseph Stalin.

The German Democratic Republic (East Germany), including Saxony, was established in 1949 out of the Soviet zone of Occupied Germany, becoming a constitutionally socialist state, part of COMECON and the Warsaw Pact, under the leadership of the SED. In 1952 the government abolished the Free State of Saxony, and divided its territory into three Bezirke: Leipzig, Dresden, and Karl-Marx-Stadt (formerly and currently Chemnitz). Areas around Hoyerswerda were also part of the Cottbus Bezirk.

The Free State of Saxony was reconstituted with slightly altered borders in 1990, following German reunification. Besides the formerly Silesian area of Saxony, which was mostly included in the territory of the new Saxony, the free state gained further areas north of Leipzig that had belonged to Saxony-Anhalt until 1952.

== Geography ==
Saxony has a total area of 18,449.89 km², making it the 10th-largest of Germany's 16 states by land area. It is bordered by the German states of Brandenburg to the north, Saxony-Anhalt to the northwest, Thuringia to the west, and Bavaria to the southwest, while its southern and eastern boundaries form part of Germany's international borders with the Czech Republic and Poland. Its eastern frontier follows sections of the Neisse and Oder–Neisse line, which also constitutes the modern German–Polish border established after the Second World War.

=== Topography ===
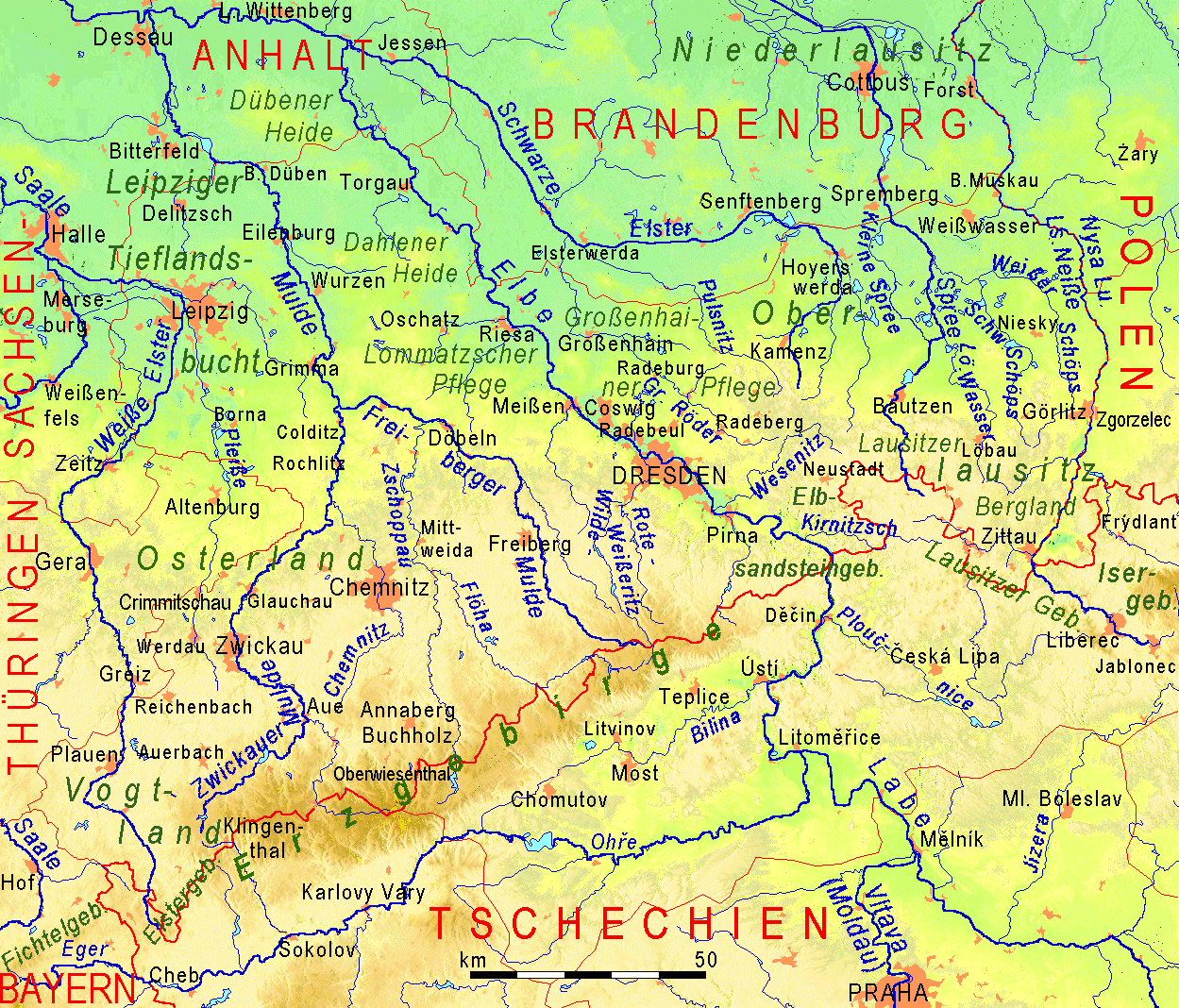
Topographic map of Saxony

Saxony spans a broad transition from the lowlands of the North German Plain in the north to upland and mountainous terrain along its southern border with the Czech Republic. This north–south gradient in relief is one of the defining features of the state's physical geography.

The northern part of Saxony lies within the glacially influenced lowlands of the southern edge of the North German Plain. It comprises the Leipzig Bay and much of the Lusatian region, where sandy soils, moraine deposits, and post-glacial landscape forms predominate. These areas were shaped primarily during the Pleistocene glaciations.

Northern Saxony is among the most fertile agricultural regions of eastern Germany, where loess-rich lowlands support intensive arable farming of crops such as wheat, barley, rapeseed, sugar beet, peas, and apples, while cattle farming and dairy farming are more prominent in the less fertile upland areas approaching the Ore Mountains, with forestry also contributing in parts of the region.

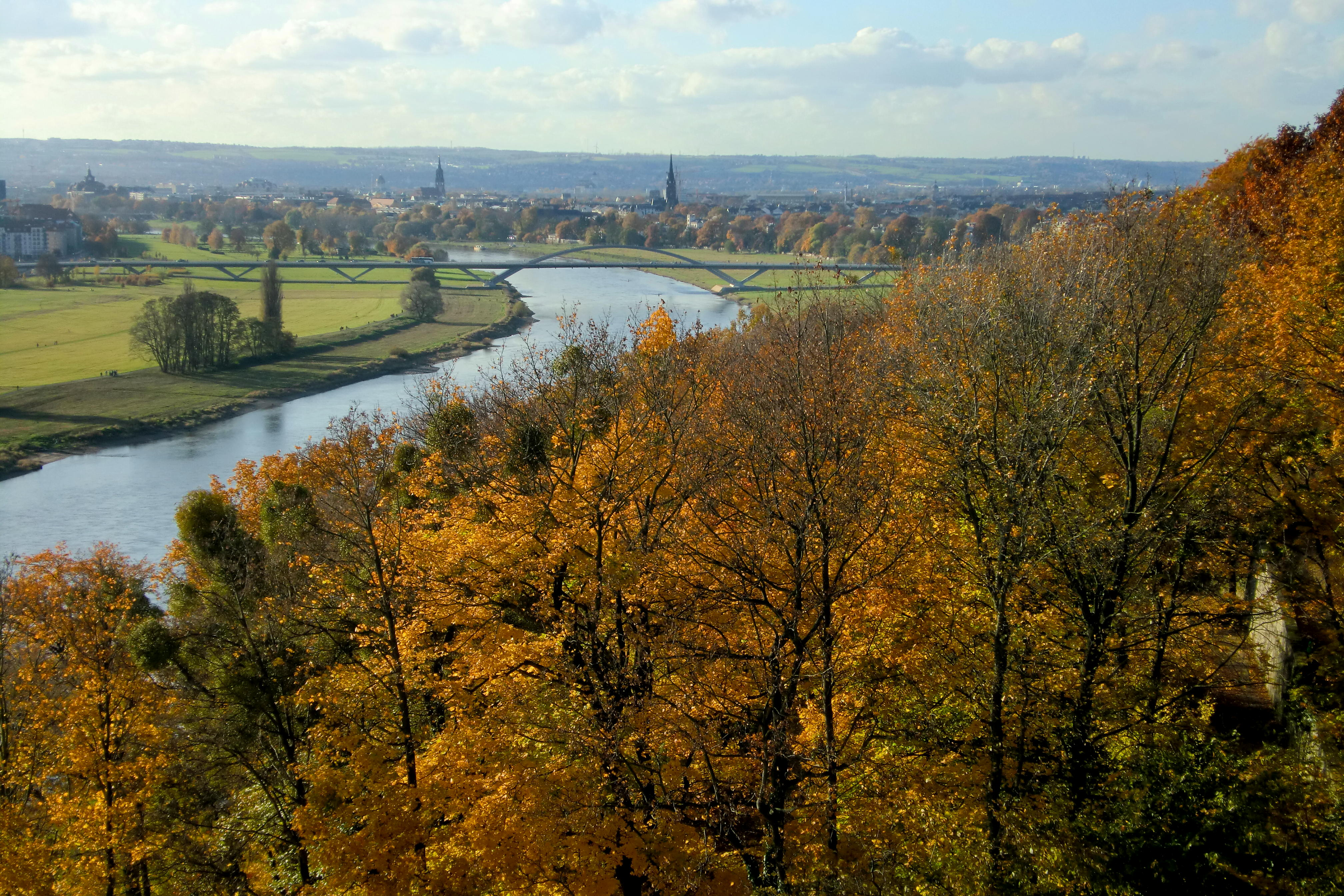
Elbe Valley in Dresden

The region is traversed by the Elbe and its tributaries, which have shaped broad valley landscapes and floodplains. The Elbe enters Saxony from the south-east, passes through the Elbe Sandstone Mountains and the Dresden Basin, and continues north-westwards into Saxony-Anhalt. Major tributaries include the Mulde, White Elster, Spree, and Neisse rivers.

Southern Saxony is dominated by upland and low mountain ranges forming part of the Central Uplands. These include the Ore Mountains, the Elbe Sandstone Mountains, the Lusatian Mountains, and the Zittau Mountains. The Ore Mountains form much of the border with the Czech Republic and contain the highest elevations in the state. Saxony's highest point is the Fichtelberg at 1,215 metres (3,985 ft).

The Elbe Sandstone Mountains, commonly referred to as Saxon Switzerland, are noted for their deeply incised sandstone gorges, mesas, and isolated rock towers. Much of this landscape is protected within the Saxon Switzerland National Park.

Former and ongoing lignite mining in Lusatia (eastern Saxony) has significantly altered the regional landscape, with decommissioned open-cast mines increasingly being flooded and recultivated into artificial lake districts. In the Ore Mountains, centuries of mining activity have likewise produced a heavily modified cultural landscape.

=== Largest cities and towns ===
The largest cities and towns in Saxony according to the 31 July 2022 estimate are listed below. Leipzig forms a conurbation with Halle, known as Ballungsraum Leipzig/Halle. The latter city is located just across the border of Saxony-Anhalt. Leipzig shares, for instance, an S-train system (known as S-Bahn Mitteldeutschland) and an airport with Halle.

| Rank | City | Population |
|---|---|---|
| 1 | Leipzig | 612,441 |
| 2 | Dresden | 560,648 |
| 3 | Chemnitz | 246,537 |
| 4 | Zwickau | 87,027 |
| 5 | Plauen | 64,419 |
| 6 | Görlitz | 56,443 |
| 7 | Freiberg | 40,271 |
| 8 | Freital | 39,576 |
| 9 | Pirna | 38,771 |
| 10 | Bautzen | 38,331 |

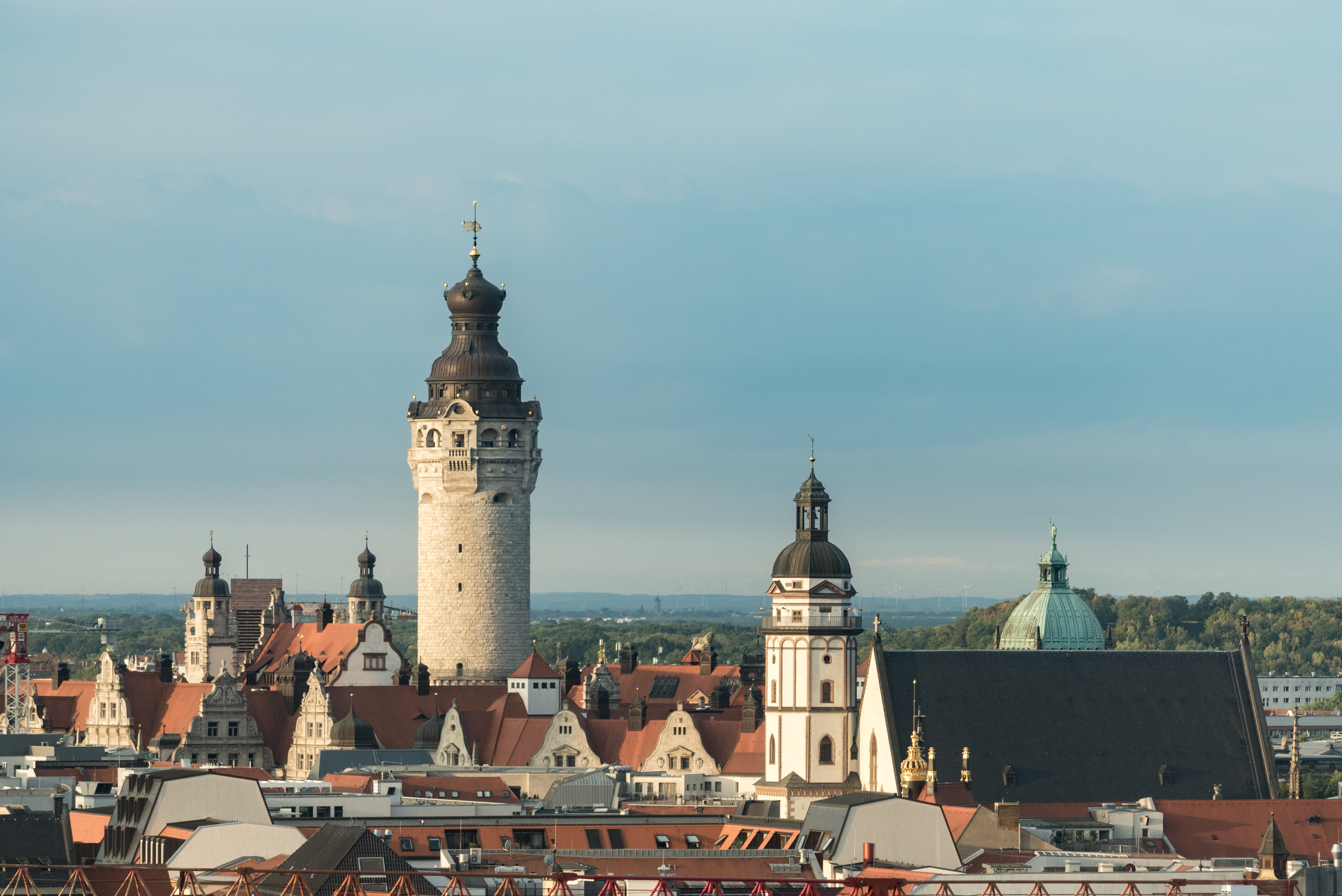
Leipzig

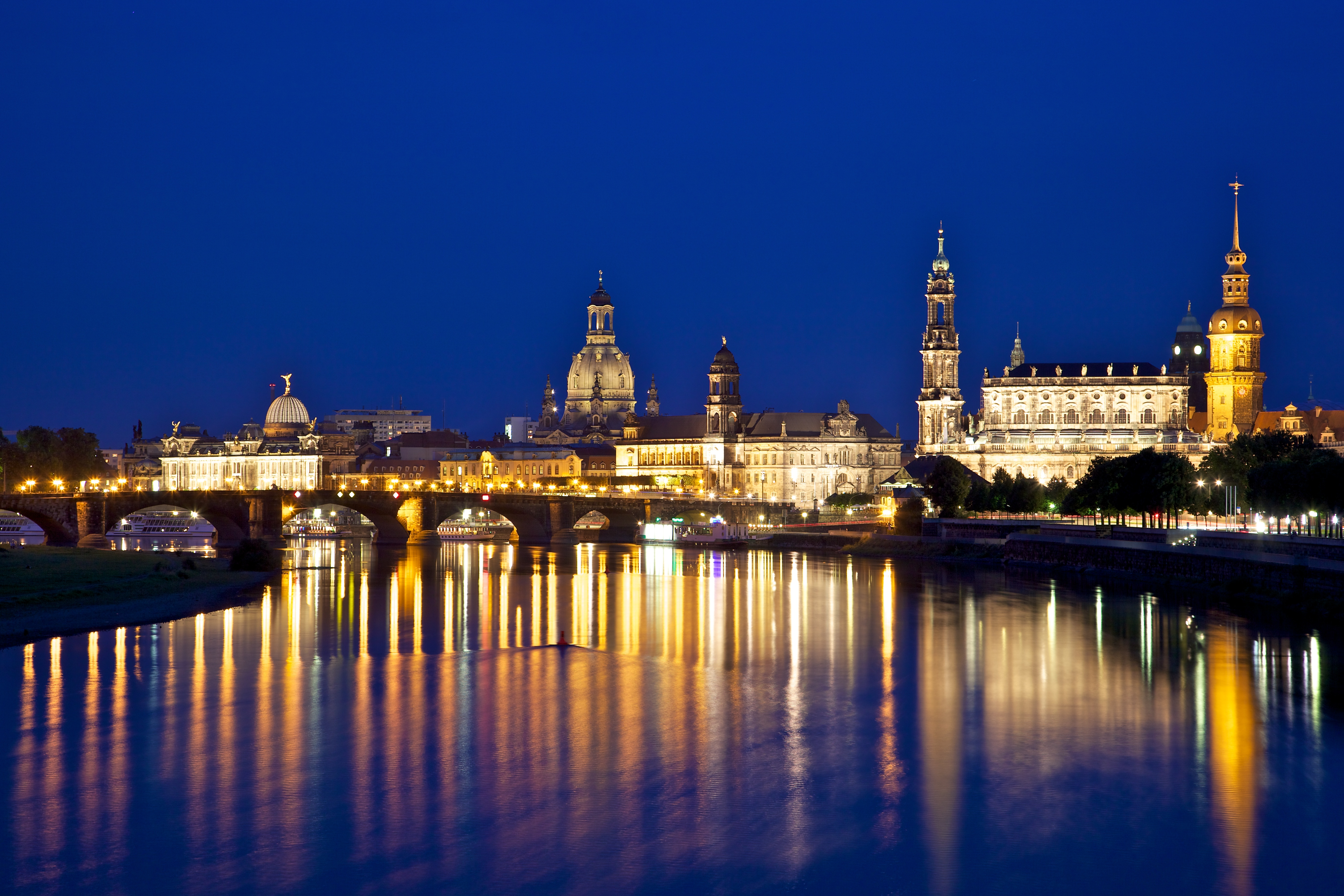
Dresden

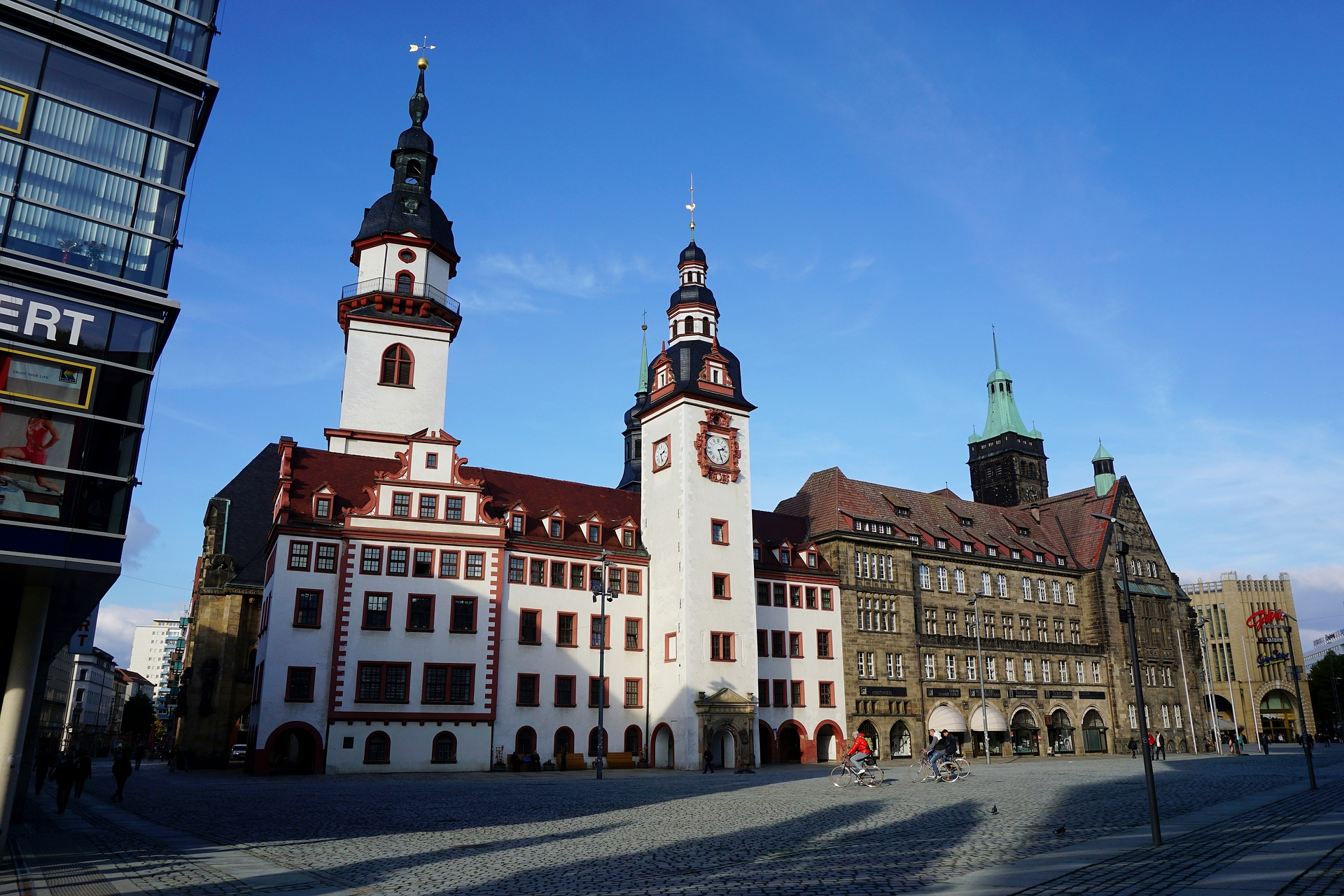
Chemnitz

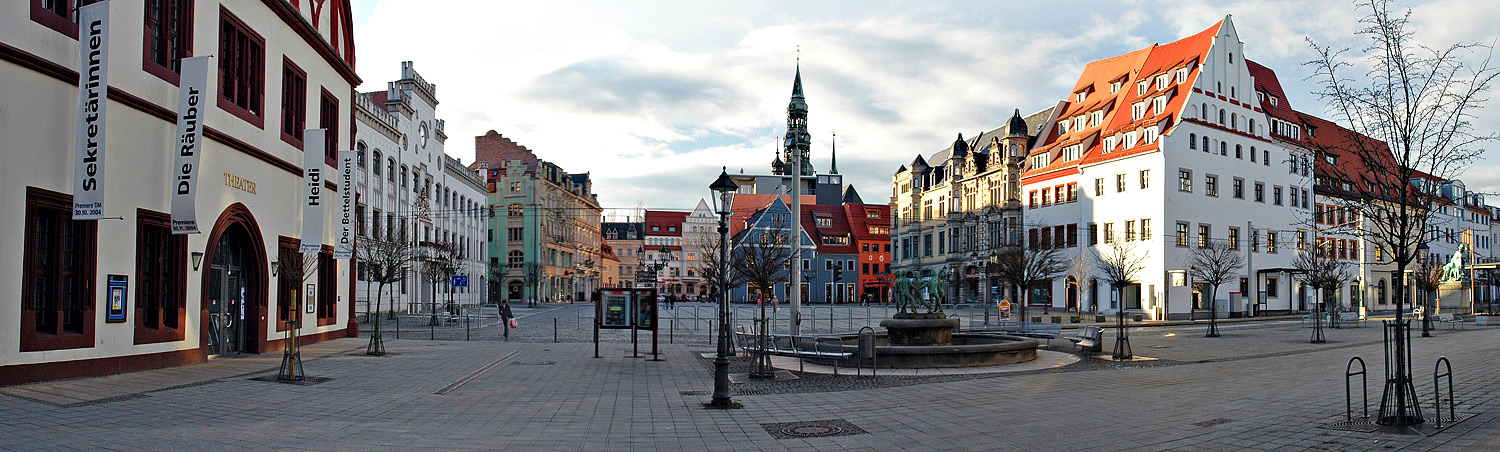
Zwickau

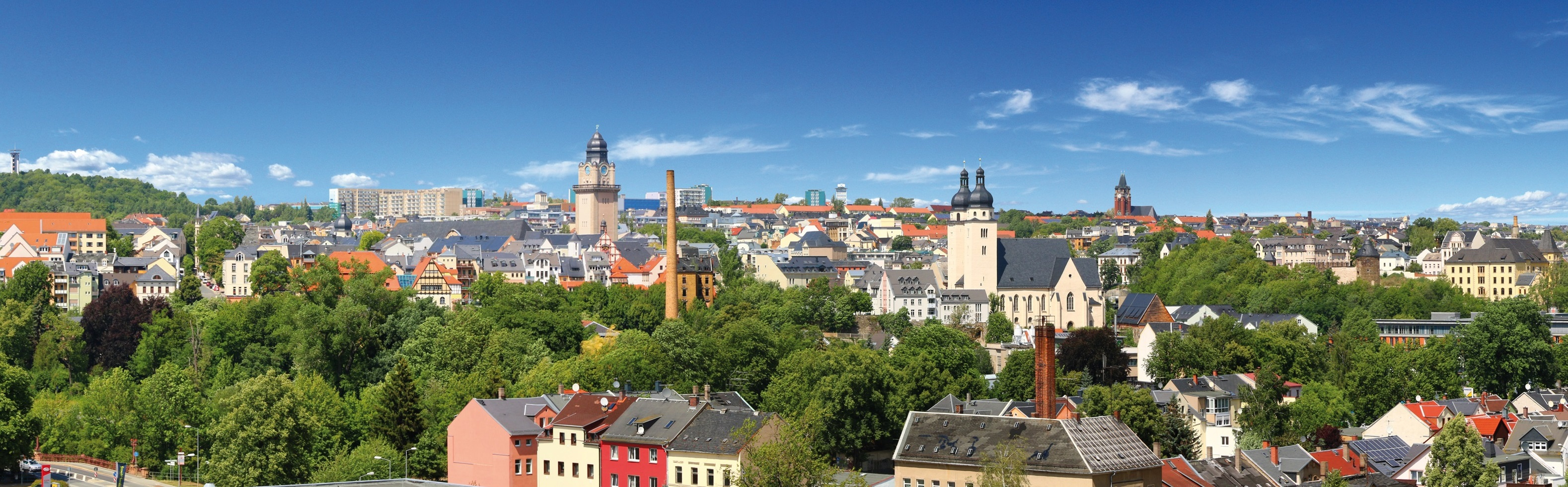
Plauen

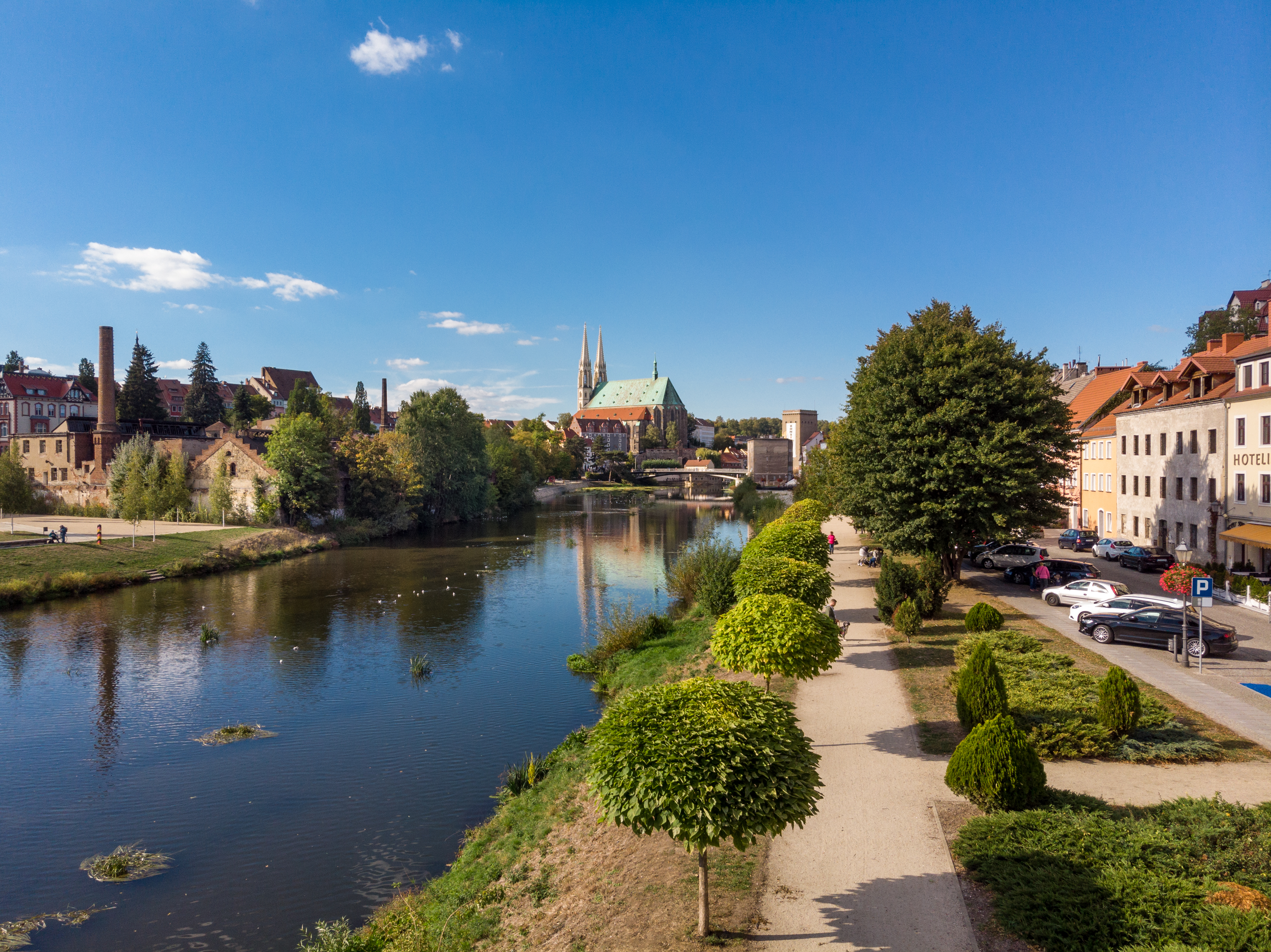
Görlitz

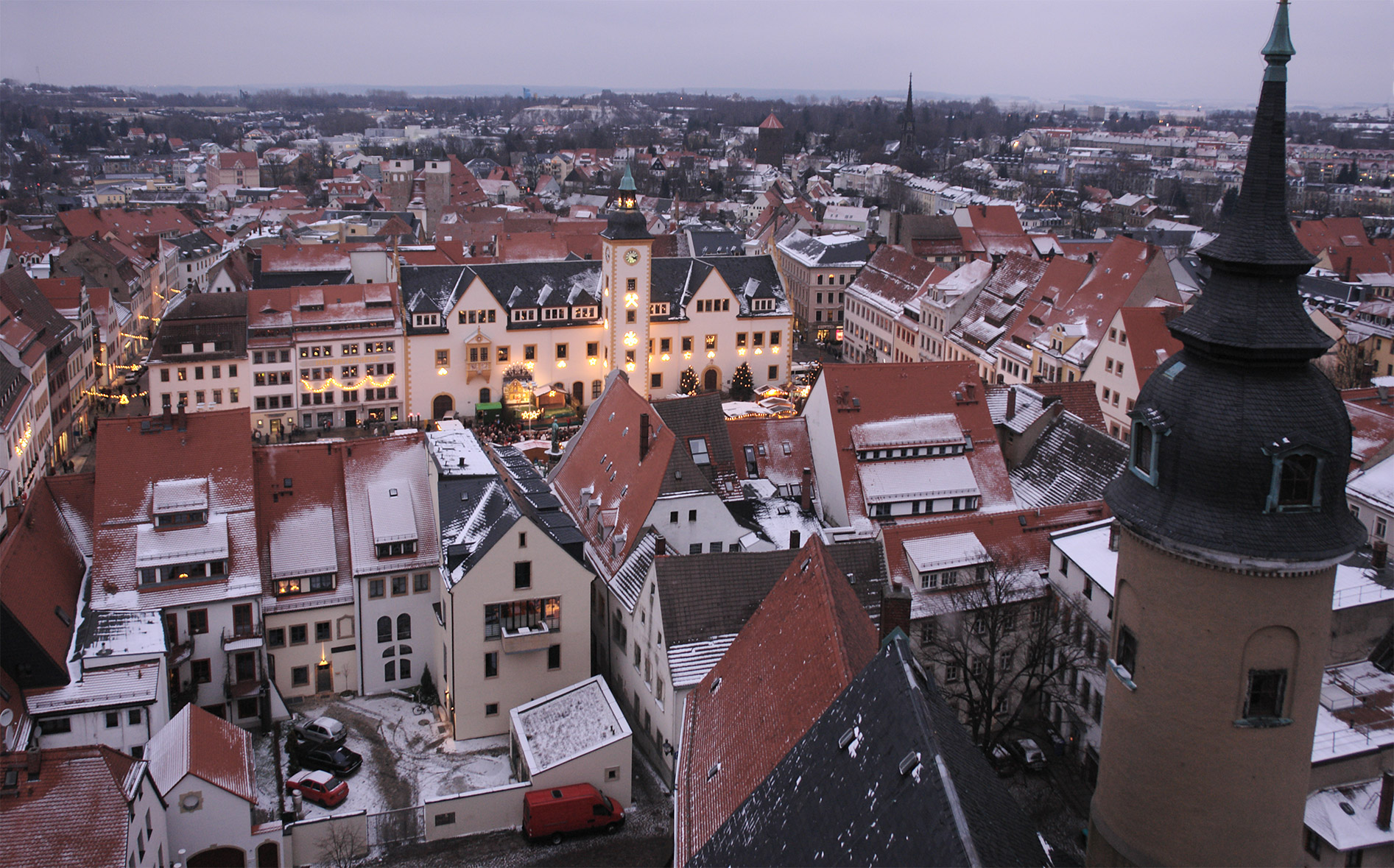
Freiberg

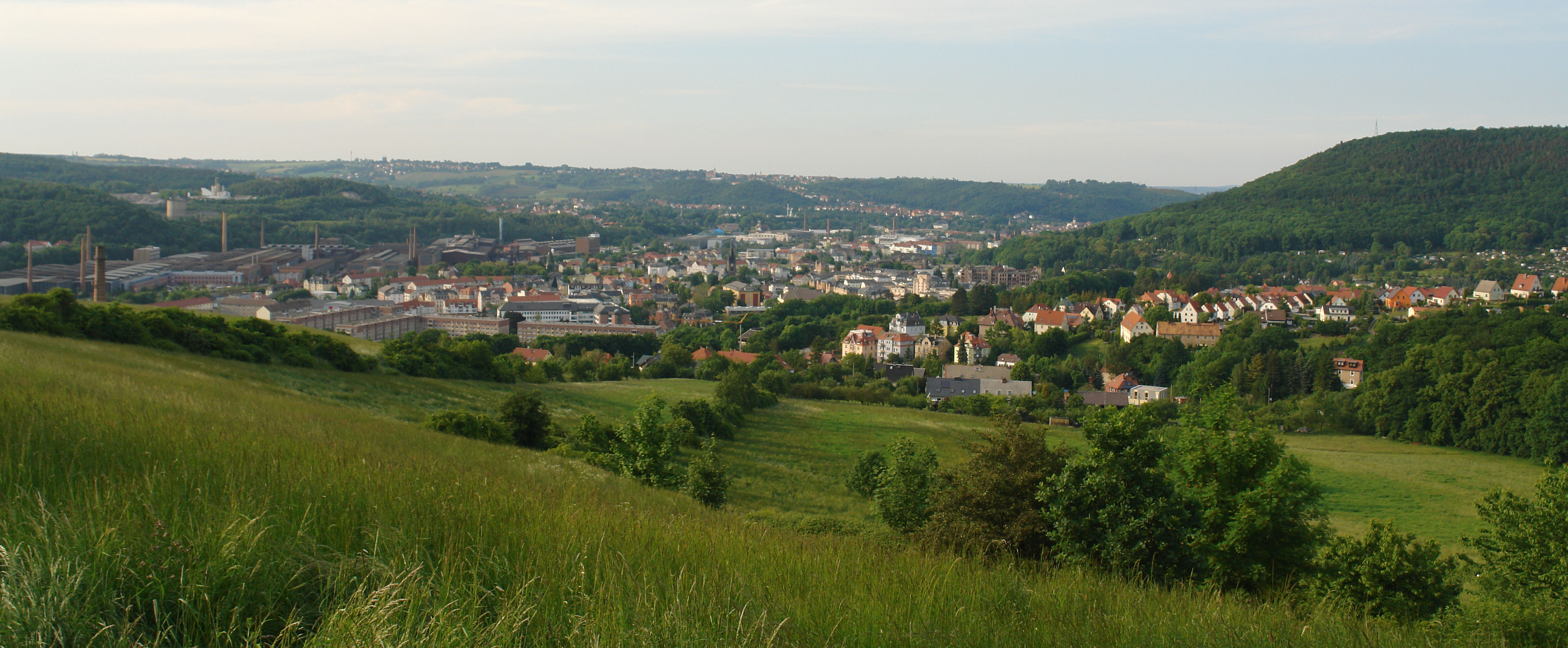
Freital

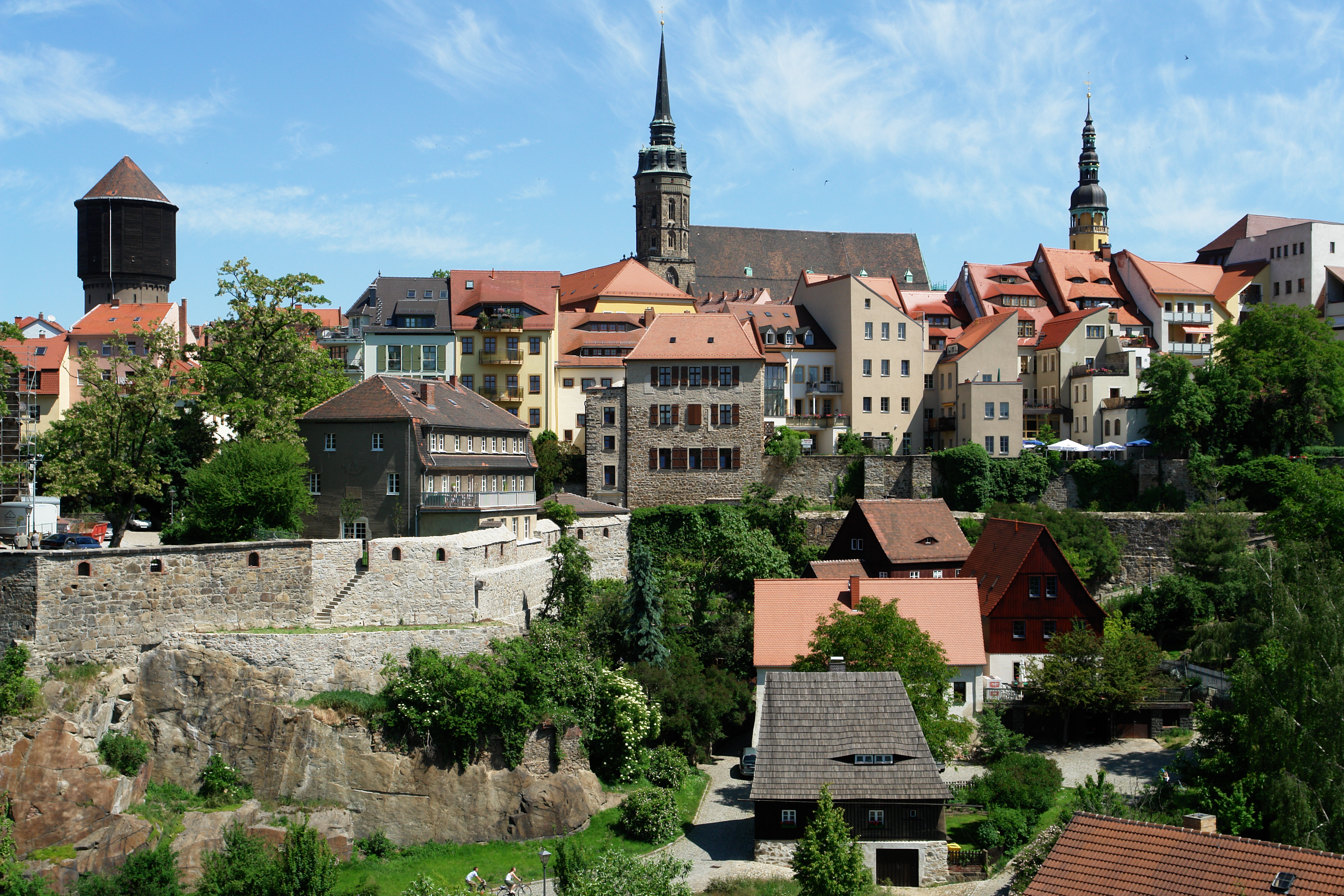
Bautzen

== Politics ==
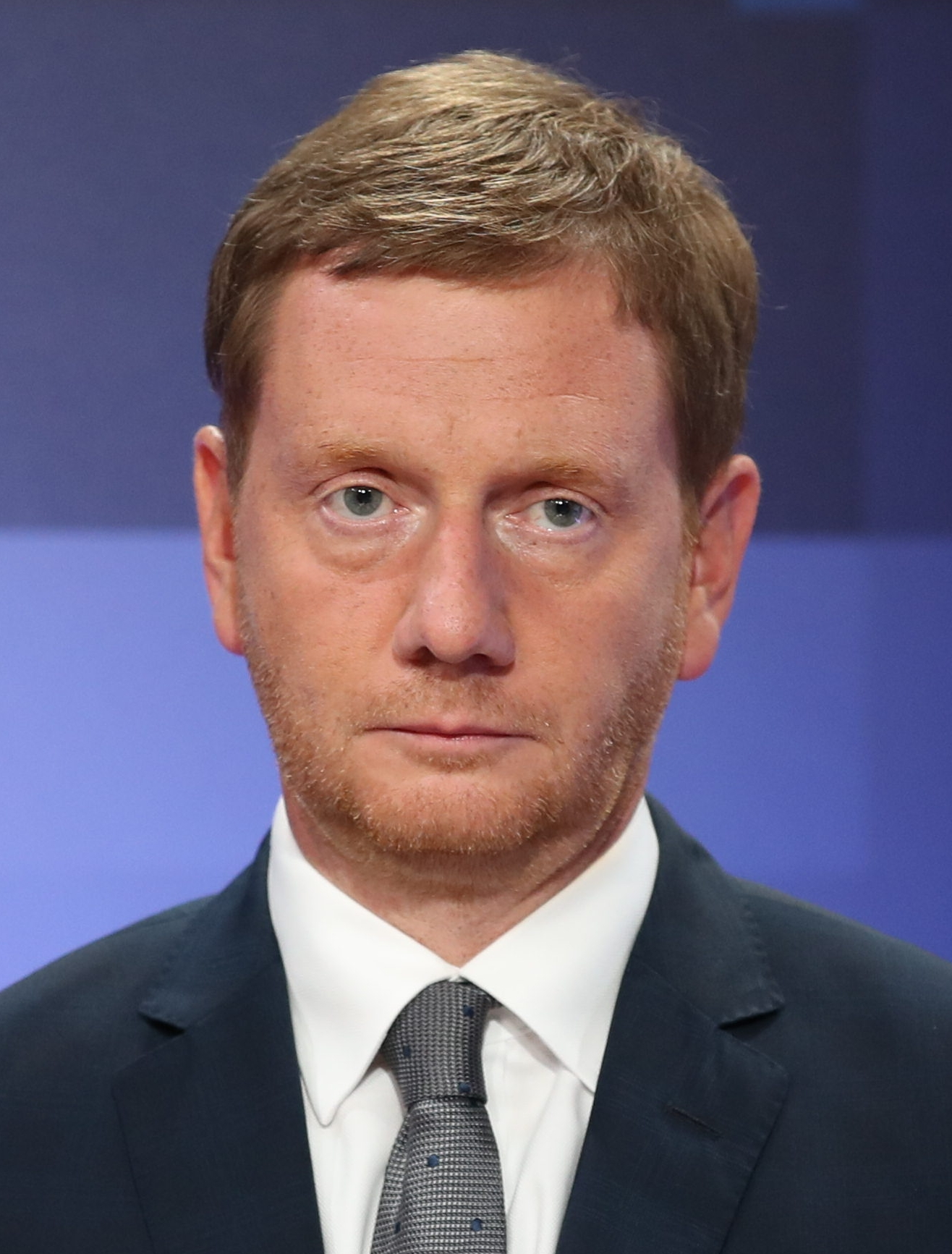
Michael Kretschmer, Minister President since 2017

Saxony is a parliamentary democracy. The Minister President of Saxony heads the government of Saxony. Michael Kretschmer has been Minister President since 13 December 2017.

=== 2024 state election ===
| Party | Party-list | | | Constituency | | | Total seats | +/– |
| Party | Votes | % | Seats | Votes | % | Seats | Total seats | +/– |
|---|---|---|---|---|---|---|---|---|
| Christian Democratic Union | 749,216 | 31.91 | 15 | 805,231 | 34.43 | 27 | 42 | ▼3 |
| Alternative for Germany | 719,274 | 30.63 | 13 | 794,176 | 33.96 | 28 | 41 | ▲3 |
| Bündnis Sahra Wagenknecht | 277,173 | 11.81 | 15 | 148,350 | 6.34 | 0 | 15 | New |
| Social Democratic Party | 172,002 | 7.33 | 9 | 144,407 | 6.17 | 0 | 9 | ▼1 |
| Alliance 90/The Greens | 119,964 | 5.11 | 4 | 119,016 | 5.09 | 2 | 6 | ▼6 |
| The Left | 104,888 | 4.47 | 4 | 149,120 | 6.38 | 2 | 6 | ▼8 |
| Free Voters | 53,008 | 2.26 | 0 | 113,042 | 4.83 | 1 | 1 | ▲1 |
| Free Saxons | 52,195 | 2.22 | 0 | 12,771 | 0.55 | 0 | 0 | 0 |
| Action Party for Animal Welfare | 23,576 | 1.00 | 0 | | | | 0 | 0 |
| Free Democratic Party | 21,003 | 0.89 | 0 | 33,644 | 1.44 | 0 | 0 | 0 |
| Die PARTEI | 19,870 | 0.85 | 0 | 2,607 | 0.11 | 0 | 0 | 0 |
| Pirate Party | 6,842 | 0.29 | 0 | | | | 0 | 0 |
| Bündnis Deutschland | 6,753 | 0.29 | 0 | 972 | 0.04 | 0 | 0 | New |
| Values Union | 6,469 | 0.28 | 0 | 1,819 | 0.08 | 0 | 0 | New |
| Grassroots Democratic Party of Germany | 4,483 | 0.19 | 0 | 702 | 0.03 | 0 | 0 | New |
| Alliance C | 4,368 | 0.19 | 0 | | | | 0 | 0 |
| V-Partei3 | 3,286 | 0.14 | 0 | | | | 0 | 0 |
| Ecological Democratic Party | 1,966 | 0.08 | 0 | 322 | 0.01 | 0 | 0 | 0 |
| Civil Rights Movement Solidarity | 1,580 | 0.07 | 0 | 752 | 0.03 | 0 | 0 | 0 |
| Team Zastrow | | | | 6,984 | 0.30 | 0 | 0 | 0 |
| Solutions for our region | | | | 2,152 | 0.09 | 0 | 0 | 0 |
| Party of Progress | | | | 248 | 0.01 | 0 | 0 | 0 |
| We Are Leipzig | | | | 382 | 0.02 | 0 | 0 | 0 |
| Independents | | | | 2,038 | 0.09 | 0 | 0 | 0 |
| Total | 2,347,916 | 100.00 | 60 | 2,338,735 | 100.00 | 60 | 120 | – |
| Valid votes | 2,347,916 | 99.16 | | 2,338,735 | 98.78 | | | |
| Invalid/blank votes | 19,783 | 0.84 | | 28,964 | 1.22 | | | |
| Total votes | 2,367,699 | 100.00 | | 2,367,699 | 100.00 | | | |
| Registered voters/turnout | 3,181,013 | 74.43 | | 3,181,013 | 74.43 | | | |

=== Members of the state government ===
| Government office | Picture | Name | Party | State Secretary | Party |
|---|---|---|---|---|---|
| Minister President | | Michael Kretschmer | CDU | | |
| First Deputy of the Minister President | | Wolfram Günther | B'90/Die Grünen | | |
| Saxon State Ministry for Energy, Climate protection, Environment und Agriculture (SMEKUL) | | Wolfram Günther | B'90/Die Grünen | Gerd Lippold Gisela Reetz | B'90/Die Grünen |
| Second Deputy of the Minister President | | Martin Dulig | SPD | | |
| Saxon State Ministry for Economic Affairs, Labour and Transport (SMWA) | | Martin Dulig | SPD | Hartmut Mangold Ines Fröhlich | SPD |
| Saxon State Ministry of the Interior (SMI) | | Roland Wöller | CDU | Thomas Rechentin; Head of office | CDU |
| Saxon State Ministry of Finance (SMF) | | Hartmut Vorjohann | CDU | Dirk Diedrichs; Head of office | non-party |
| Saxon State Ministry of Justice and for Democracy, European Affairs and Equality (SMJ) | | Katja Meier | B'90/Die Grünen | Mathias Weilandt Gesine Märtens | B'90/Die Grünen |
| Saxon State Ministry of Education (SMK) | | Christian Piwarz | CDU | Herbert Wolff | CDU |
| Saxon State Ministry of Science (SMWK) | | Sebastian Gemkow | CDU | Andrea Franke | CDU |
| Saxon State Ministry of Culture and Tourism (SMWK) | | Barbara Klepsch | CDU | Andrea Franke | CDU |
| Saxon State Ministry of Social Affairs (SMS) | | Petra Köpping | SPD | Uwe Gaul (until July 5, 2021); Sebastian Vogel (since July 6, 2021); Dagmar Neukirch | SPD |
| Saxon State Ministry of Regional Development (SMR) | | Thomas Schmidt | CDU | Frank Pfeil | non-party |
| Head of the Saxon State Chancellery and State Minister of Federal matters and Media | | Oliver Schenk | CDU | Thomas Popp; Digital Administration and Administrative modernization (Member of the state government) Conrad Clemens; Authorized representative of the free state Saxony to the federal government of Germany | CDU |

=== 2024 European Parliament election ===
In the 2024 European Parliament election, AfD received the highest percentage of votes in Saxony, winning 31.8% of the ballots. The other states where AfD has become the strongest party are Thuringia, Saxony-Anhalt, Mecklenburg-Vorpommern, and Brandenburg. These four states were part of East Germany like Saxony. Compared to the last election, AfD increased their votes in Saxony which was 25.3% in the 2019 European Parliament election.

CDU/CSU received 21.8% of the votes in Saxony and became the second strongest party in the 2024 EP election. BSW was in the third place by receiving 12.6% of the votes. The Left lost a significant proportion of their votes compared to the 2019 election. Their votes regressed from 11.7% to 4.9%.

==== Federal politics ====
Saxony has 16 constituencies for the Bundestag.

=== Administration ===
Saxony is divided into 10 districts:

Map of Saxony's 10 districts

1. Bautzen (BZ)
2. Erzgebirgskreis (ERZ)
3. Görlitz (GR)
4. Leipzig (L)
5. Meissen (MEI) (Meissen)
6. Mittelsachsen (FG)
7. Nordsachsen (TDO)
8. Sächsische Schweiz-Osterzgebirge (PIR)
9. Vogtlandkreis (V)
10. Zwickau (Z)

In addition, three cities have the status of an urban district (German: kreisfreie Stadt):

1. Chemnitz (C)
2. Dresden (DD)
3. Leipzig (L)

Between 1990 and 2008, Saxony was divided into the three regions (Regierungsbezirke) of Chemnitz, Dresden, and Leipzig. The 1994–1996 Saxony district reform created 22 new districts and seven independent cities. After the 2008 Saxony district reform, these regions – with some alterations of their respective areas – were called Direktionsbezirke. In 2012, the authorities of these regions were merged into one central authority, the Landesdirektion Sachsen.

== Demographics ==
=== Population change ===
Saxony is a densely populated state if compared with more rural German states such as Bavaria or Lower Saxony. However, the population has declined over time. The population of Saxony began declining in the 1950s due to emigration, a process which accelerated after the fall of the Berlin Wall in 1989. After bottoming out in 2013, the population has stabilized due to increased immigration and higher fertility rates. The cities of Leipzig, Dresden and Chemnitz, and the towns of Radebeul and Markkleeberg in their vicinity, have seen their populations increase since 2000. The following tables illustrate the foreign resident populations and the population of Saxony from 1816 to 2022:

Significant foreign resident populations as of 31 December
| Nationality | Population (2022) | Population (2023) |
|---|---|---|
| Ukraine | 61,795 | 65,750 |
| Syria | 31,310 | 37,985 |
| Poland | 23,730 | 25,170 |
| Romania | 15,725 | 16,200 |
| Afghanistan | 9,270 | 14,605 |
| Russia | 11,620 | 13,985 |
| Vietnam | 9,735 | 10,020 |
| Turkey | 7,130 | 9,790 |
| Czech Republic | 8,840 | 9,745 |
| India | 7,675 | 8,670 |

Historical population

| Year | Pop. | ±% |
|---|---|---|
| 1816 | 1,200,000 | — |
| 1837 | 1,652,114 | +37.7% |
| 1849 | 1,894,431 | +14.7% |
| 1858 | 2,122,148 | +12.0% |
| 1871 | 2,556,244 | +20.5% |
| 1880 | 2,972,805 | +16.3% |
| 1885 | 3,182,003 | +7.0% |
| 1890 | 3,502,684 | +10.1% |
| 1895 | 3,787,688 | +8.1% |
| 1900 | 4,202,216 | +10.9% |
| 1905 | 4,508,601 | +7.3% |
| 1910 | 4,806,661 | +6.6% |
| 1914 | 4,986,000 | +3.7% |

| Year | Pop. | ±% |
|---|---|---|
| 1919 | 4,670,311 | −6.3% |
| 1925 | 4,996,138 | +7.0% |
| 1939 | 5,158,329 | +3.2% |
| 1946 | 5,558,566 | +7.8% |
| 1950 | 5,682,802 | +2.2% |
| 1964 | 5,463,571 | −3.9% |
| 1970 | 5,419,187 | −0.8% |
| 1981 | 5,152,857 | −4.9% |
| 1990 | 4,775,873 | −7.3% |
| 2000 | 4,384,192 | −8.2% |
| 2011 | 4,056,799 | −7.5% |
| 2022 | 4,038,131 | −0.5% |

=== Birthrate ===
The average number of children per woman in Saxony was 1.60 in 2018, the fourth-highest rate of all German states. Within Saxony, the highest is the Bautzen district with 1.77, while Leipzig is the lowest with 1.49. Dresden's fertility rate of 1.58 is the highest of all German cities with more than 500,000 inhabitants.

=== Sorbian population ===
Saxony is home to the Sorbs. There are currently between 45,000 and 60,000 Sorbs living in Saxony (Upper Lusatia region). Today's Sorb minority is the remainder of the Slavic population that settled throughout Saxony in the early Middle Ages and over time slowly assimilated into the German speaking society. Many geographic names in Saxony are of Sorbic origin (including the three largest cities Chemnitz, Dresden and Leipzig). The Sorbic language and culture are protected by special laws and cities and villages in eastern Saxony that are inhabited by a significant number of Sorbian inhabitants have bilingual street signs and administrative offices provide service in both, German and Sorbian. The Sorbs enjoy cultural self-administration which is exercised through the Domowina. Former Minister President Stanislaw Tillich is of Sorbian ancestry and has been the first leader of a German state from a national minority.

=== Religion ===
Religion in Saxony – 2025
| Religion | Percent |
| None or other | 81.7% |
| EKD Protestants | 14.9% |
| Roman Catholics | 3.4% |

As of 2025, 81.7% of the population was not religious or adhered to religions other than the Evangelical Church or Catholicism. 14.9% of the population belonged to the Evangelical Church (EKD), the largest religious body, and 3.4% to the Roman Catholic Church.

As of 2011, 72.6% of people are not affiliated with any religion. The Protestant Church in Germany represents the largest Christian denomination in the state, adhered to by 21.4% of the population. Members of the Roman Catholic Church formed a minority of 3.8%. About 0.9% of the Saxons belonged to an Evangelical free church (Evangelische Freikirche, i.e. various Protestants outside the EKD), 0.3% to Orthodox churches and 1% to other religious communities. The Moravian Church (see above) still maintains its religious centre in Herrnhut and it is there where 'The Daily Watchwords' (Losungen) are selected each year which are in use in many churches worldwide. In particular in the larger cities, there are numerous smaller religious communities.

The international Church of Jesus Christ of Latter-day Saints has a presence in the Freiberg Germany Temple which was the first of its kind in Germany, opened in 1985 even before its counterpart in Western Germany. It now also serves as a religious center for the church members in Poland, the Czech Republic, Slovakia, and Hungary. In Leipzig, there is a significant Buddhist community, which mainly caters to the population of Vietnamese origin, with one Buddhist temple built in 2008 and another one currently under construction. The Sikh faith also maintains a presence in Saxony's three largest cities with three (though small) Gurdwara.

== Economy ==
The gross domestic product (GDP) of the state was 124.6 billion euros in 2018, accounting for 3.7% of German economic output. GDP per capita adjusted for purchasing power was 28,100 euros or 93% of the EU27 average in the same year. The GDP per employee was 85% of the EU average. The GDP per capita was the highest of the states of the former GDR. Saxony has a "very high" Human Development Index value of 0.930 (2018), which is at the same level as Denmark. Within Germany Saxony is ranked 9th.

Unemployment rate

| Year | % |
|---|---|
| 1999 | 17.2 |
| 2000 | 17.0 |
| 2001 | 17.5 |
| 2002 | 17.8 |
| 2003 | 17.9 |
| 2004 | 17.8 |
| 2005 | 18.3 |
| 2006 | 17.0 |
| 2007 | 14.7 |
| 2008 | 12.8 |
| 2009 | 12.9 |

| Year | % |
|---|---|
| 2010 | 11.8 |
| 2011 | 10.6 |
| 2012 | 9.8 |
| 2013 | 9.8 |
| 2014 | 8.8 |
| 2015 | 8.2 |
| 2016 | 7.5 |
| 2017 | 6.7 |
| 2018 | 6.0 |
| 2019 | 5.5 |

Saxony has, after Saxony-Anhalt, the most vibrant economy of the states of the former East Germany (GDR). Its economy grew by 1.9% in 2010. Nonetheless, unemployment remains above the German average. The eastern part of Germany, excluding Berlin, qualifies as an "Objective 1" development-region within the European Union, and was eligible to receive investment subsidies up to 30% until 2013. FutureSAX, a business plan competition and entrepreneurial support organisation, has been in operation since 2002.

Microchip-makers near Dresden have given the region the nickname "Silicon Saxony". The publishing and porcelain industries of the region are well known, although their contributions to the regional economy are no longer significant. Today, the automobile industry, machinery production, and services mainly contribute to the economic development of the region.

Saxony reported an average unemployment of 5.5% in 2019.

The Leipzig area, which until recently was among the regions with the highest unemployment rate, could benefit greatly from investments by Porsche and BMW. With the VW Phaeton factory in Dresden, and many parts suppliers, the automobile industry has again become one of the pillars of Saxon industry, as it was in the early 20th century. Zwickau is another major Volkswagen location. Freiberg, a former mining town, has emerged as a foremost location for solar technology. Dresden and some other regions of Saxony play a leading role in some areas of international biotechnology, such as electronic bioengineering. While these high-technology sectors do not yet offer a large number of jobs, they have stopped or even reversed the brain drain that was occurring until the early 2000s in many parts of Saxony. Regional universities have strengthened their positions by partnering with local industries. Glashütte is the birthplace of the German watchmaking industry and home to highly regarded watch manufacturers such as A. Lange & Söhne and Glashütte Original.

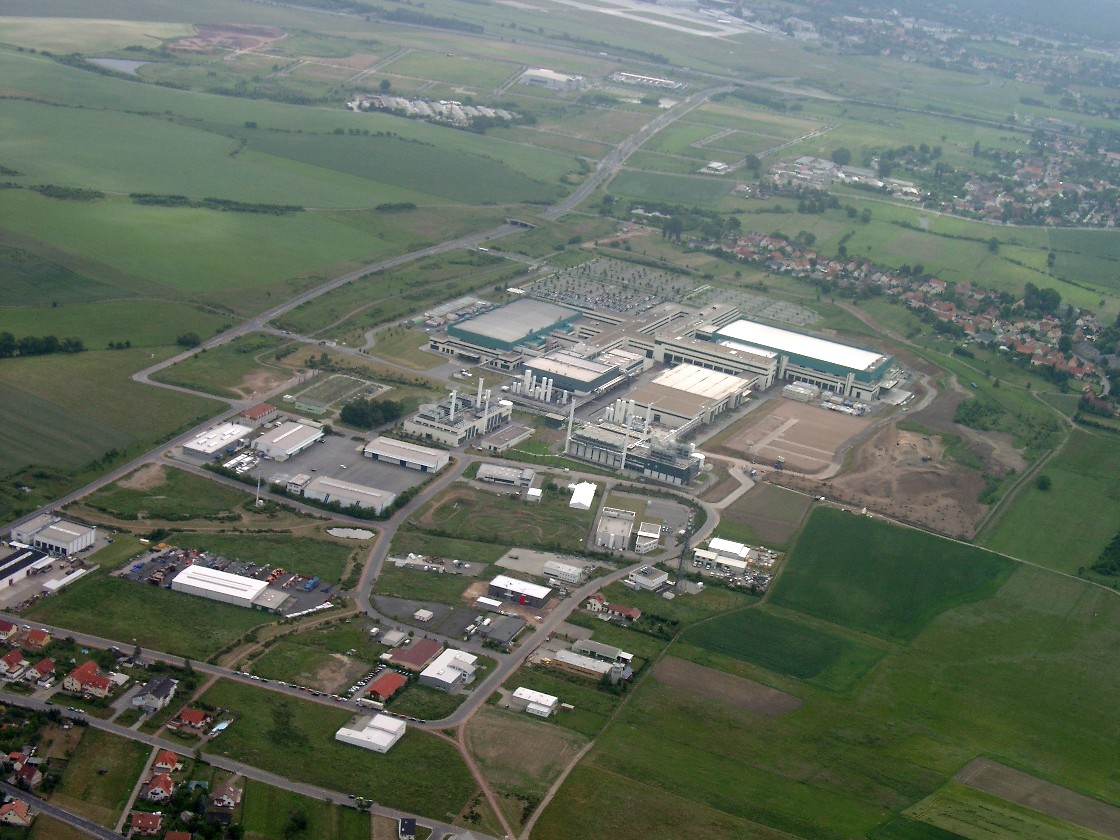
Dresden is the hub of Silicon Saxony.

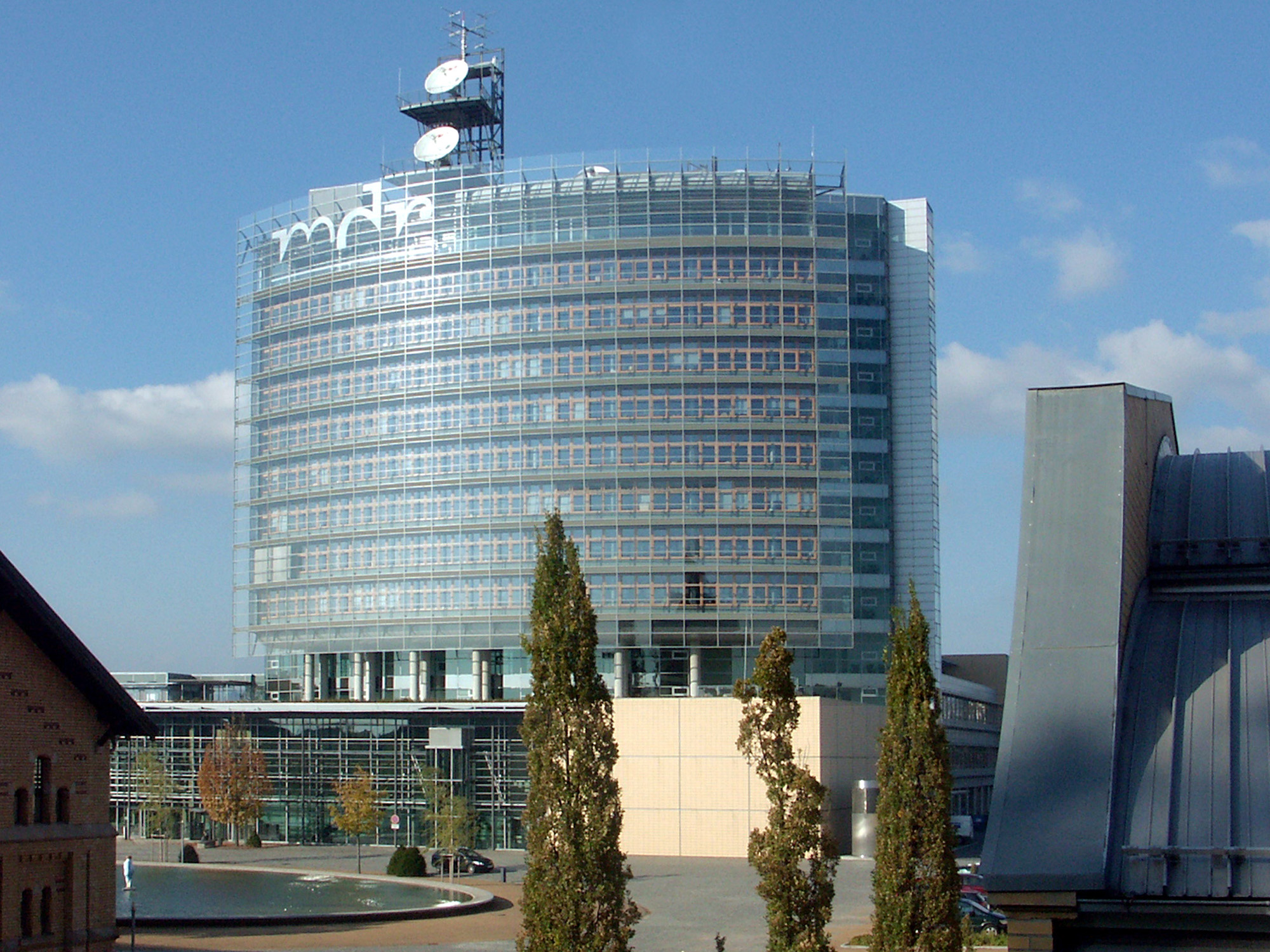
Mitteldeutscher Rundfunk is one of Germany's public broadcasters.

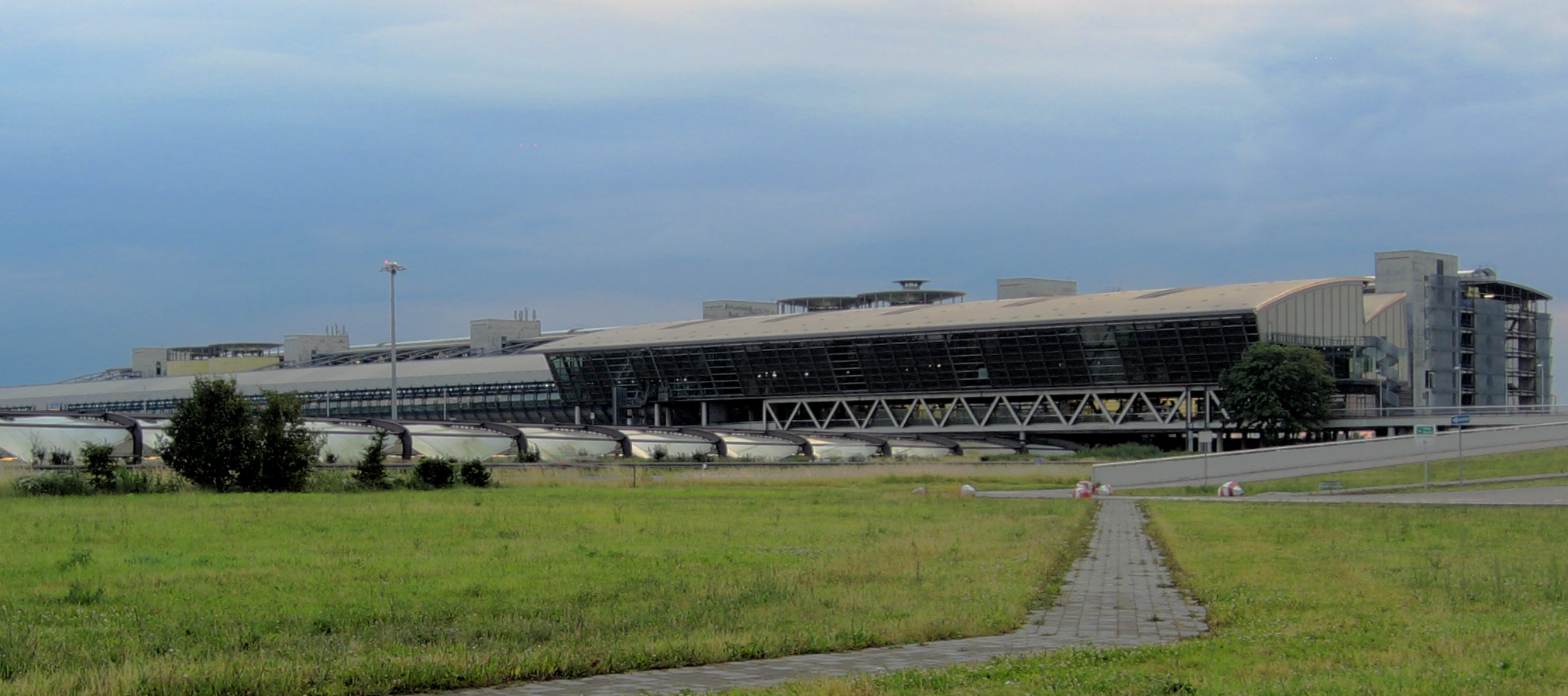
Leipzig/Halle Airport is the main hub of DHL and the fifth-busiest airport in Europe in terms of cargo traffic.

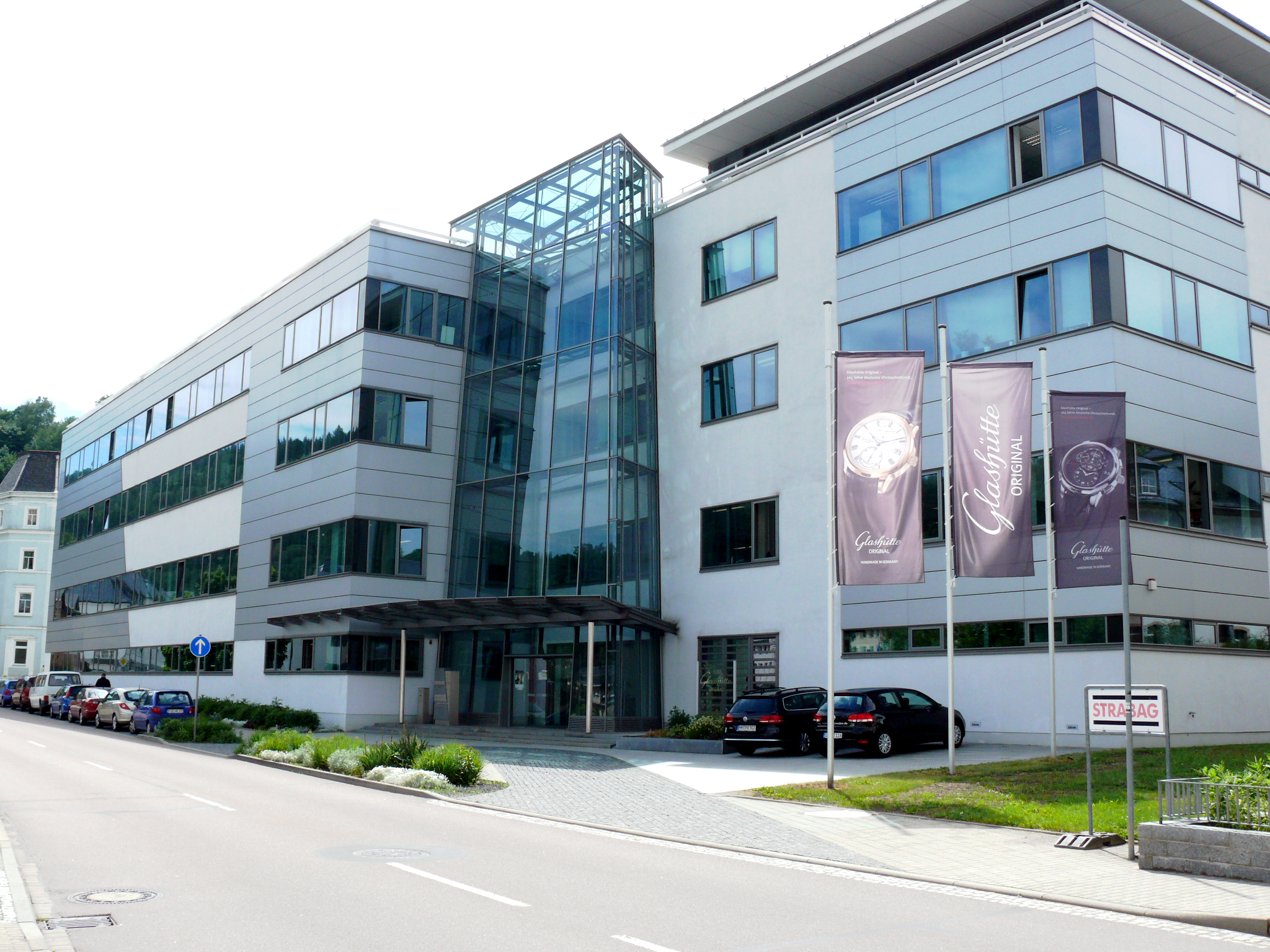
Glashütte is the birthplace of the German watchmaking industry.

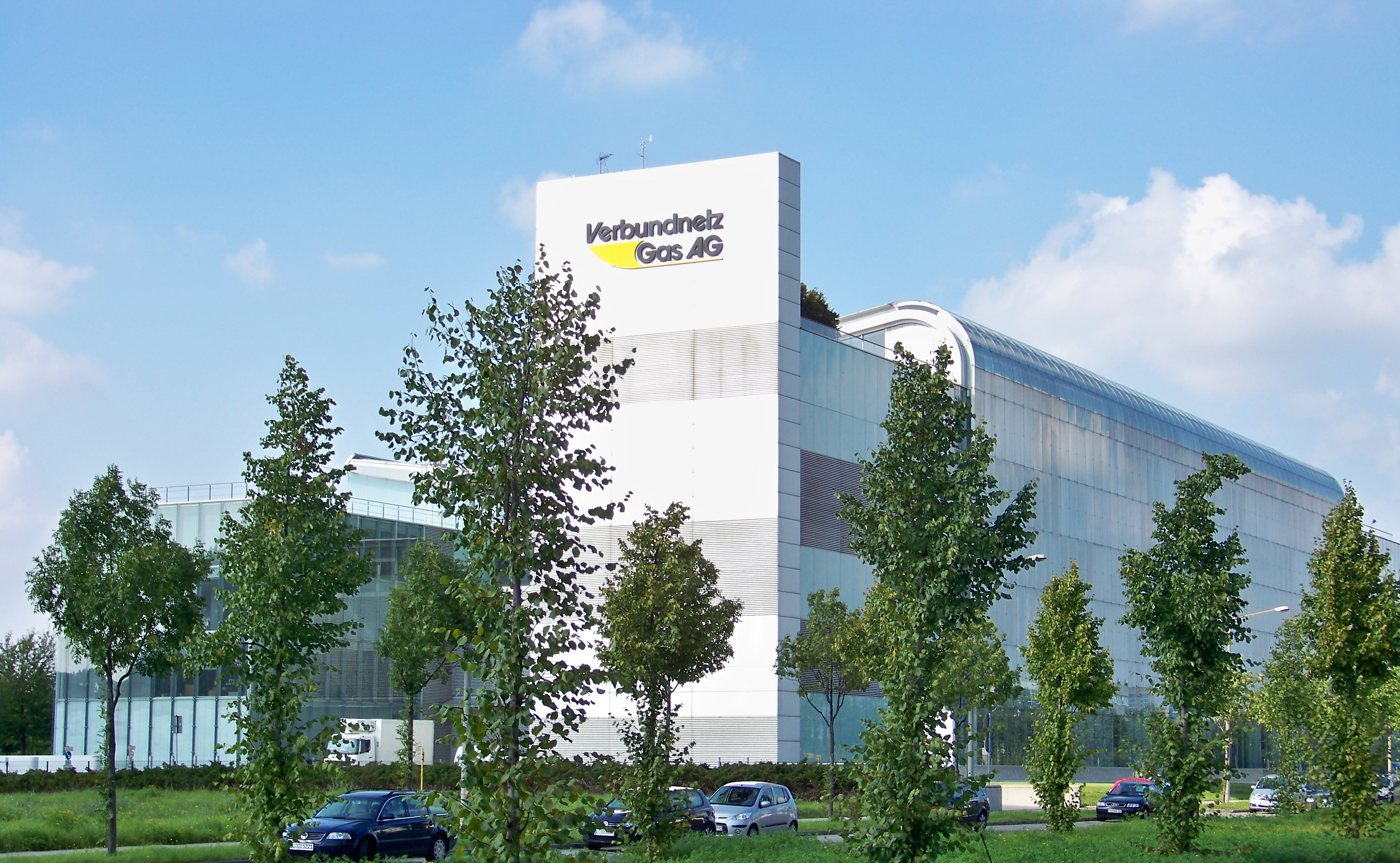
VNG – Verbundnetz Gas in Leipzig is the third-largest natural-gas importer in Germany.

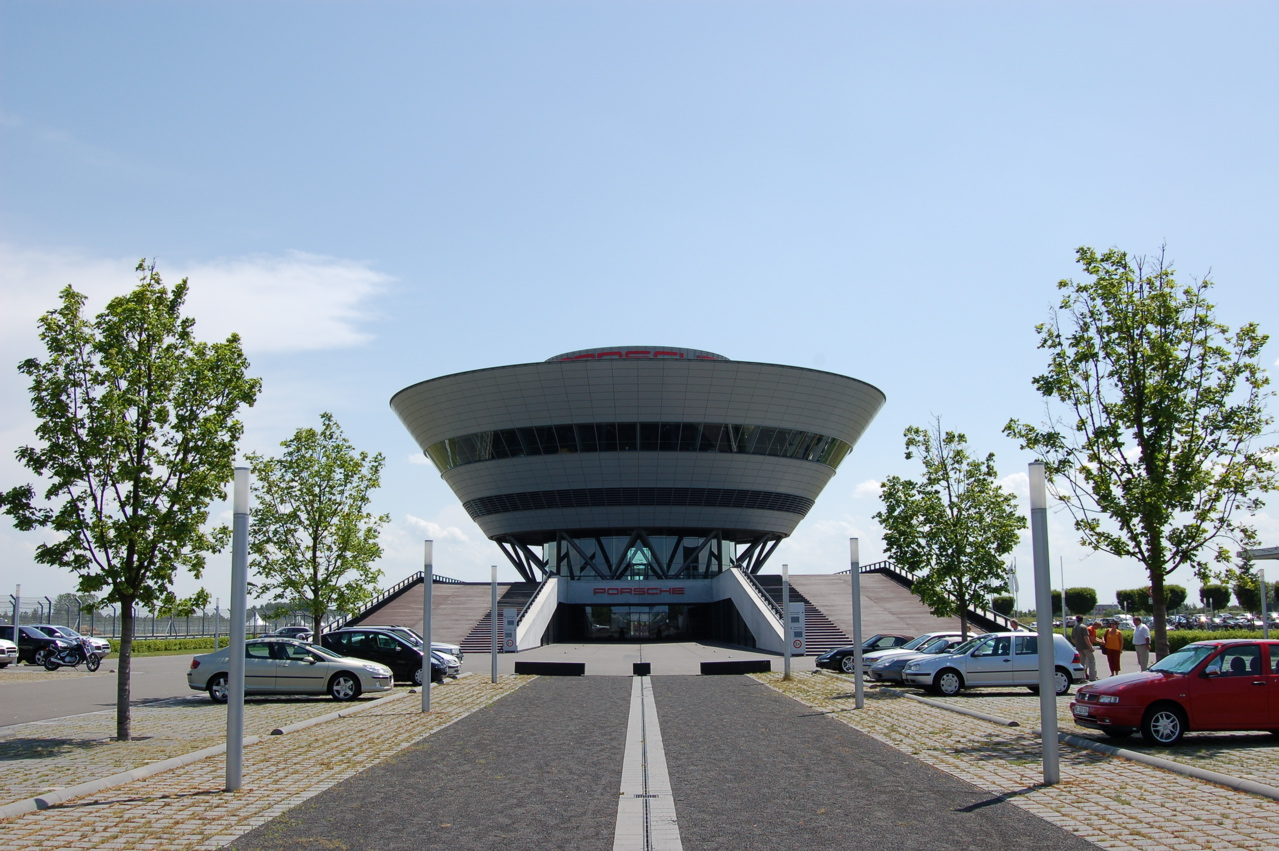
Porsche customer center in Leipzig

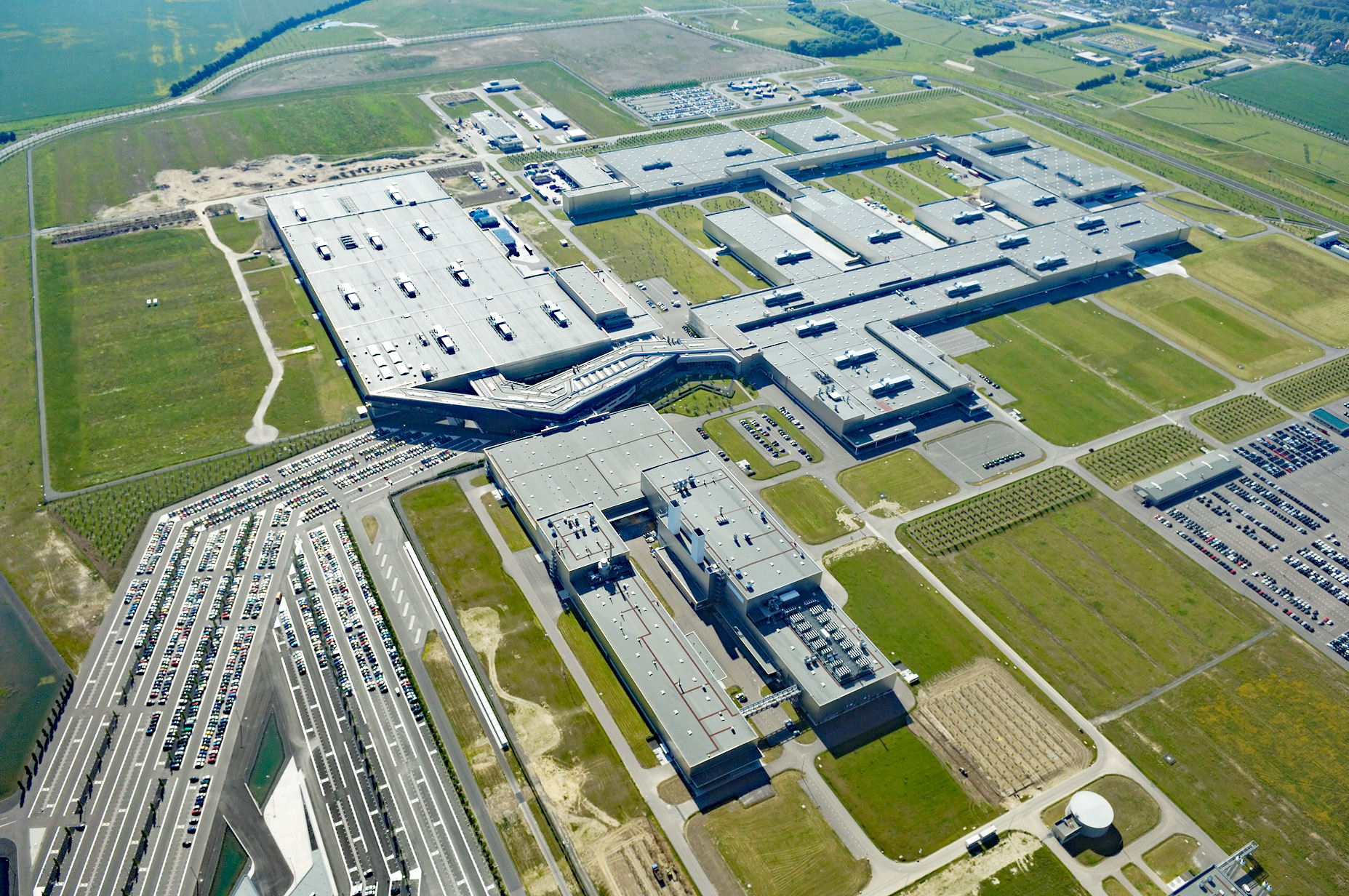
BMW production facility in Leipzig

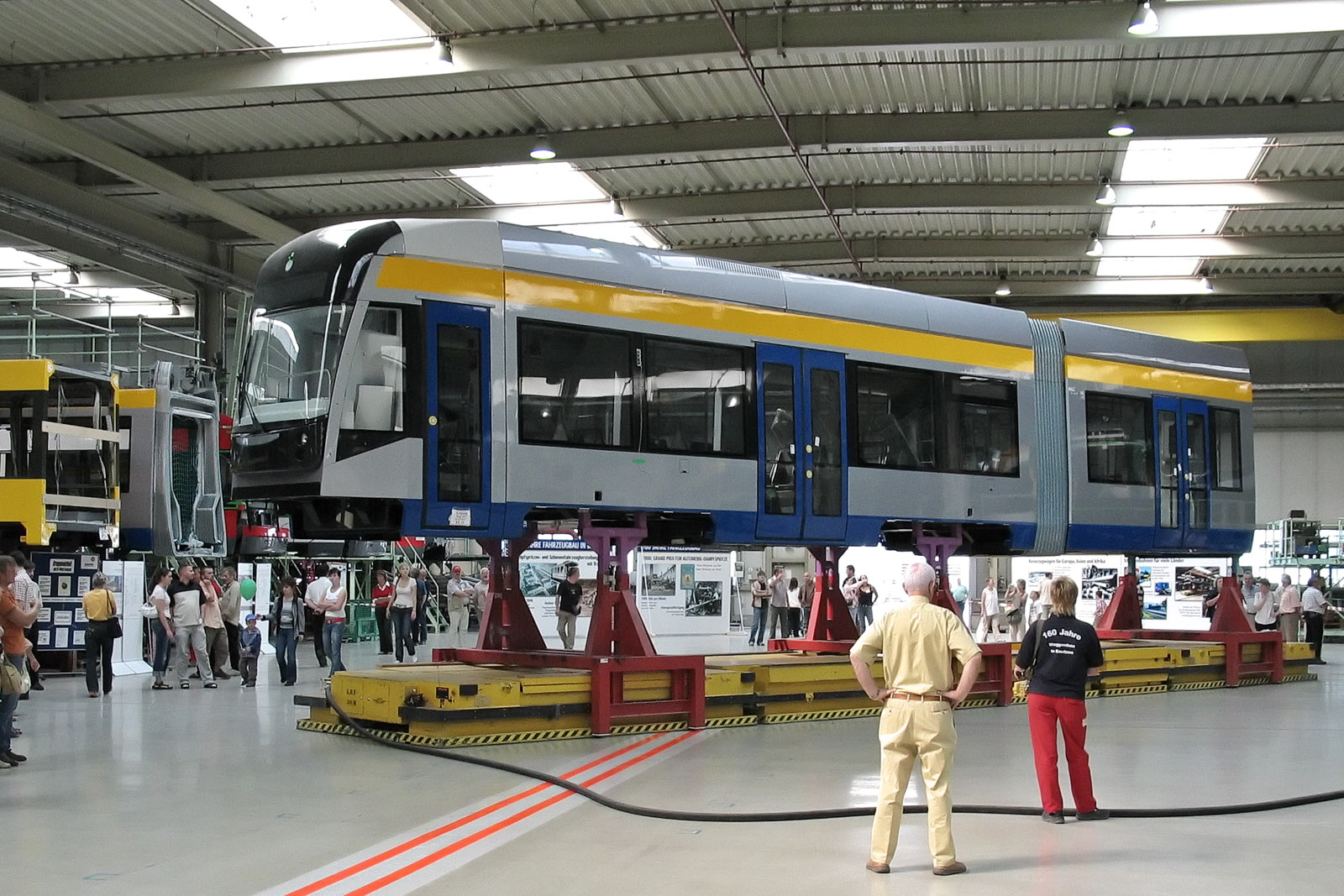
Bombardier Transportation in Bautzen

=== International trade ===
Saxony is a strongly export-oriented economy. In 2018, exports amounted to 40.48 billion euros while imports stood at 24.41 billion euros. The largest export partner of Saxony is China with an amount of 6.72 billion euros, while the second largest export market are the United States with 3.59 billion. The largest exporting sectors are the automobile industry and mechanical engineering.

In April 2022, Saxony received about 84% of its imported oil and gas from Russia while nationally Germany only imported about one third from Russia. This is mainly due to the pipeline network, which since the time of the GDR has been strongly integrated with the Soviet Union, similar to other states of Eastern Europe.

=== Tourism ===
Saxony is a renowned tourist destination in Germany. The cities of Dresden and Leipzig are two of Germany's most visited cities. Areas along the border with the Czech Republic, such as the Lusatian Mountains, Ore Mountains, Saxon Switzerland, and Vogtland, attract significant numbers of visitors. In addition, Saxony has well-preserved historic towns such as Görlitz, Bautzen, Freiberg, Pirna, Meissen and Stolpen as well as numerous castles and palaces. New tourist destinations are developing, notably in the Lusatian Lake District.

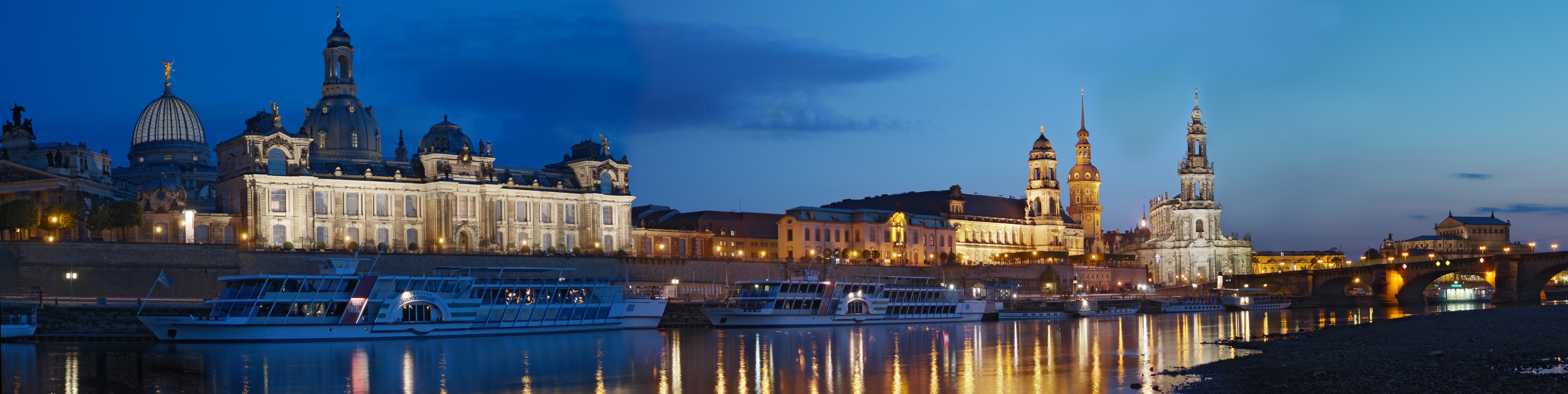
Dresden is one of the most visited cities in Germany and Europe.

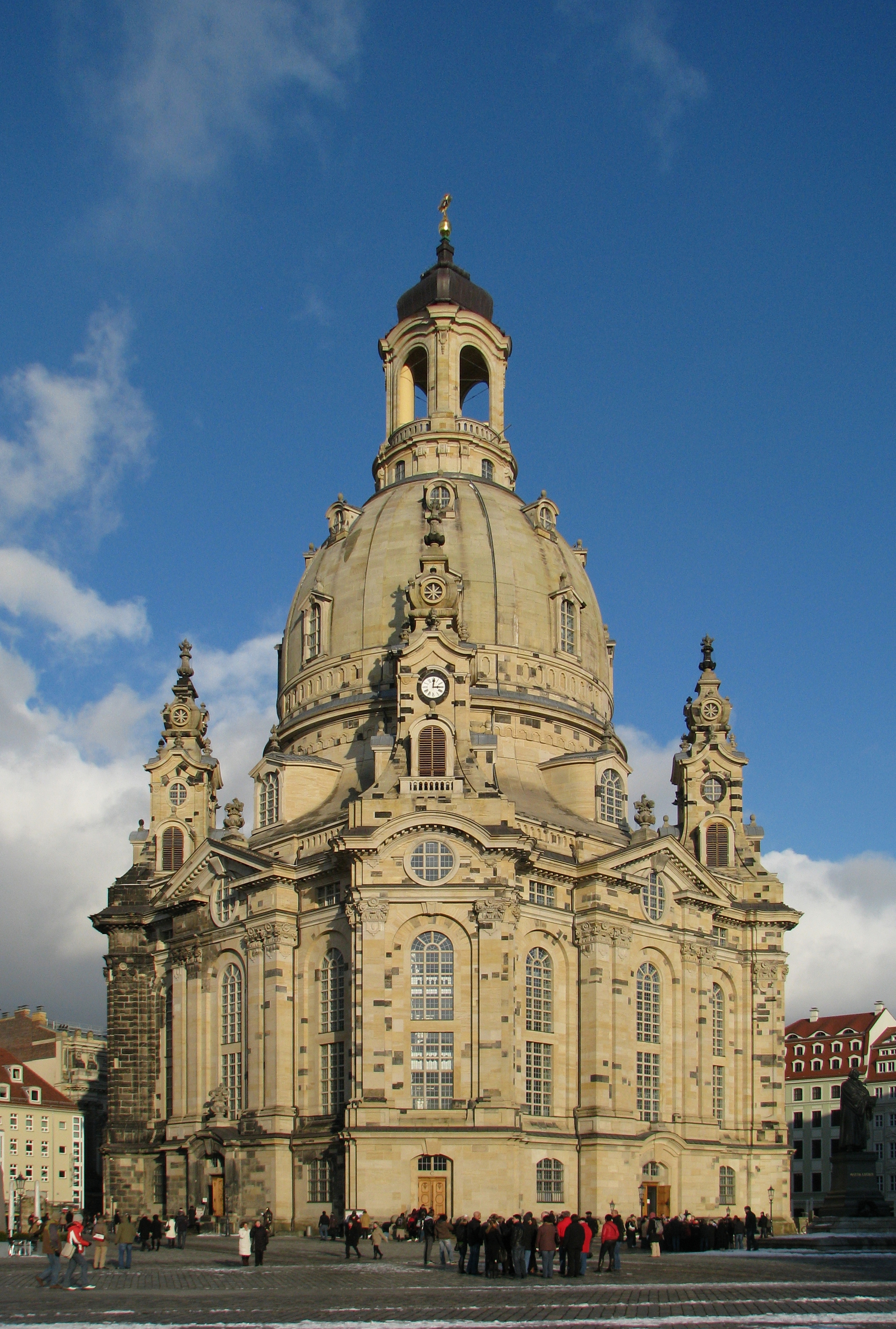
The Dresden Frauenkirche. It now serves as a symbol of reconciliation between former warring enemies.

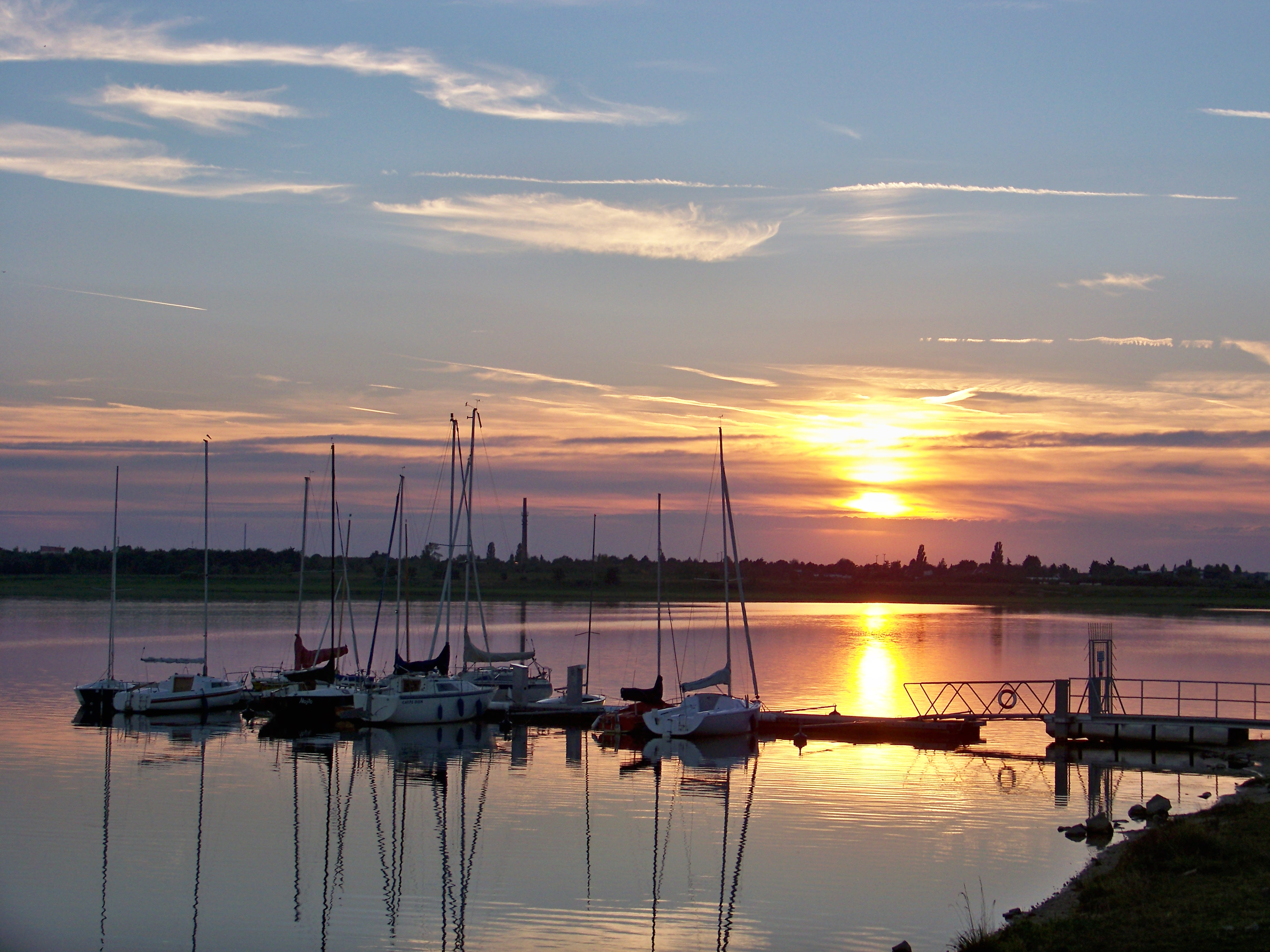
Leipziger Neuseenland is a large lake district south of Leipzig, one of Germany's most vibrant cities.

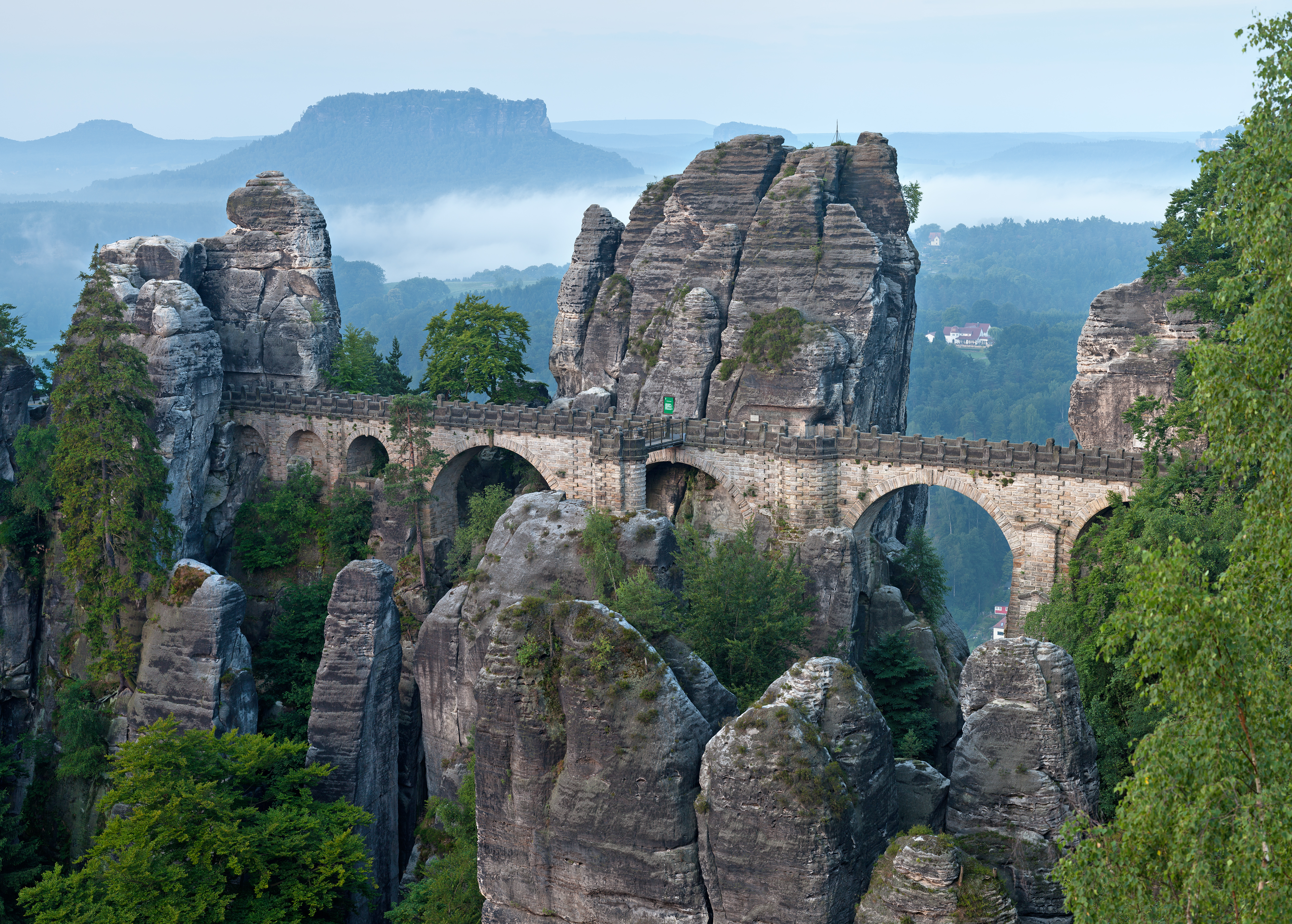
The Bastei bridge in Saxon Switzerland

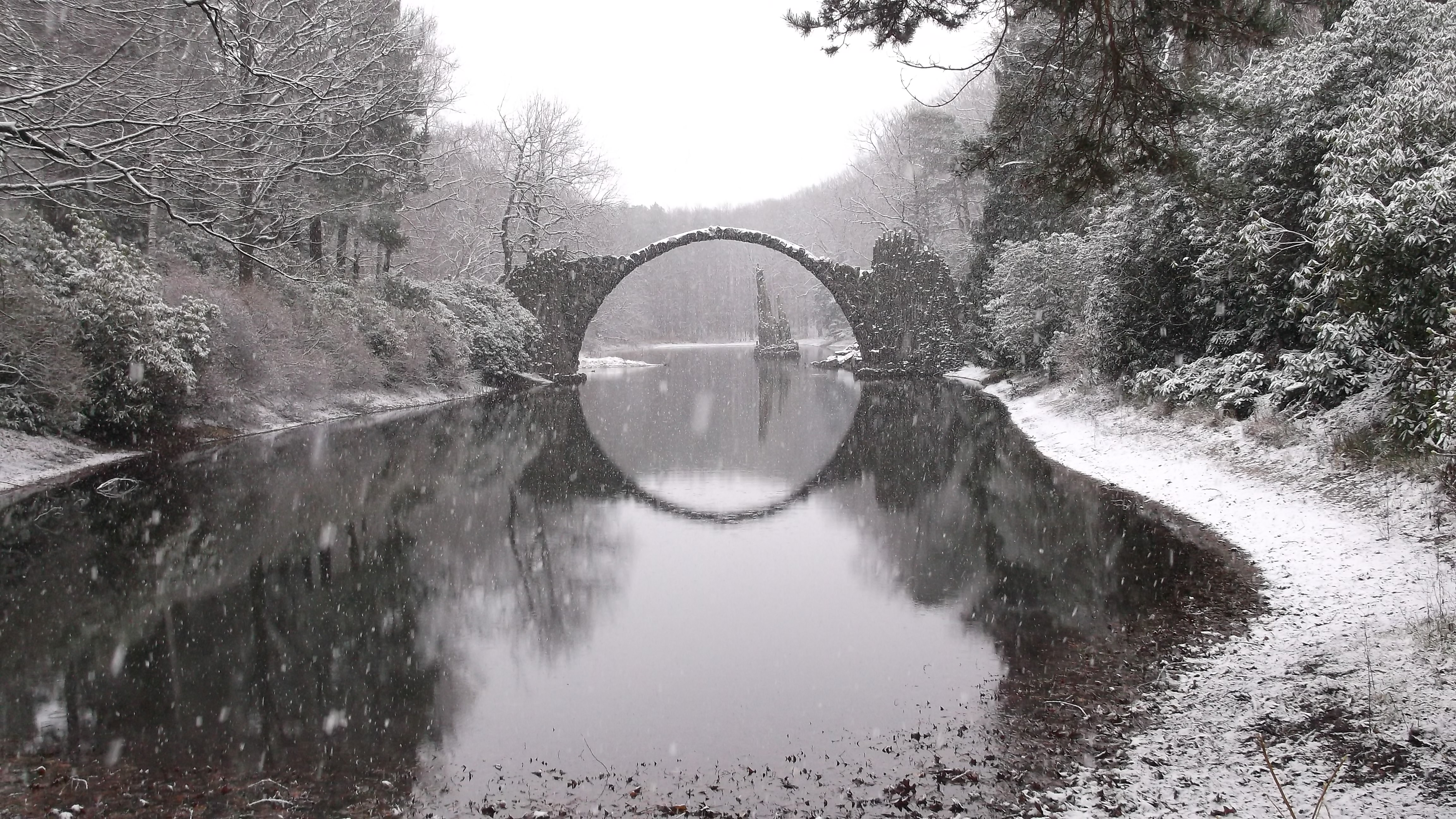
The Rakotz bridge at Azalea and Rhododendron Park Kromlau

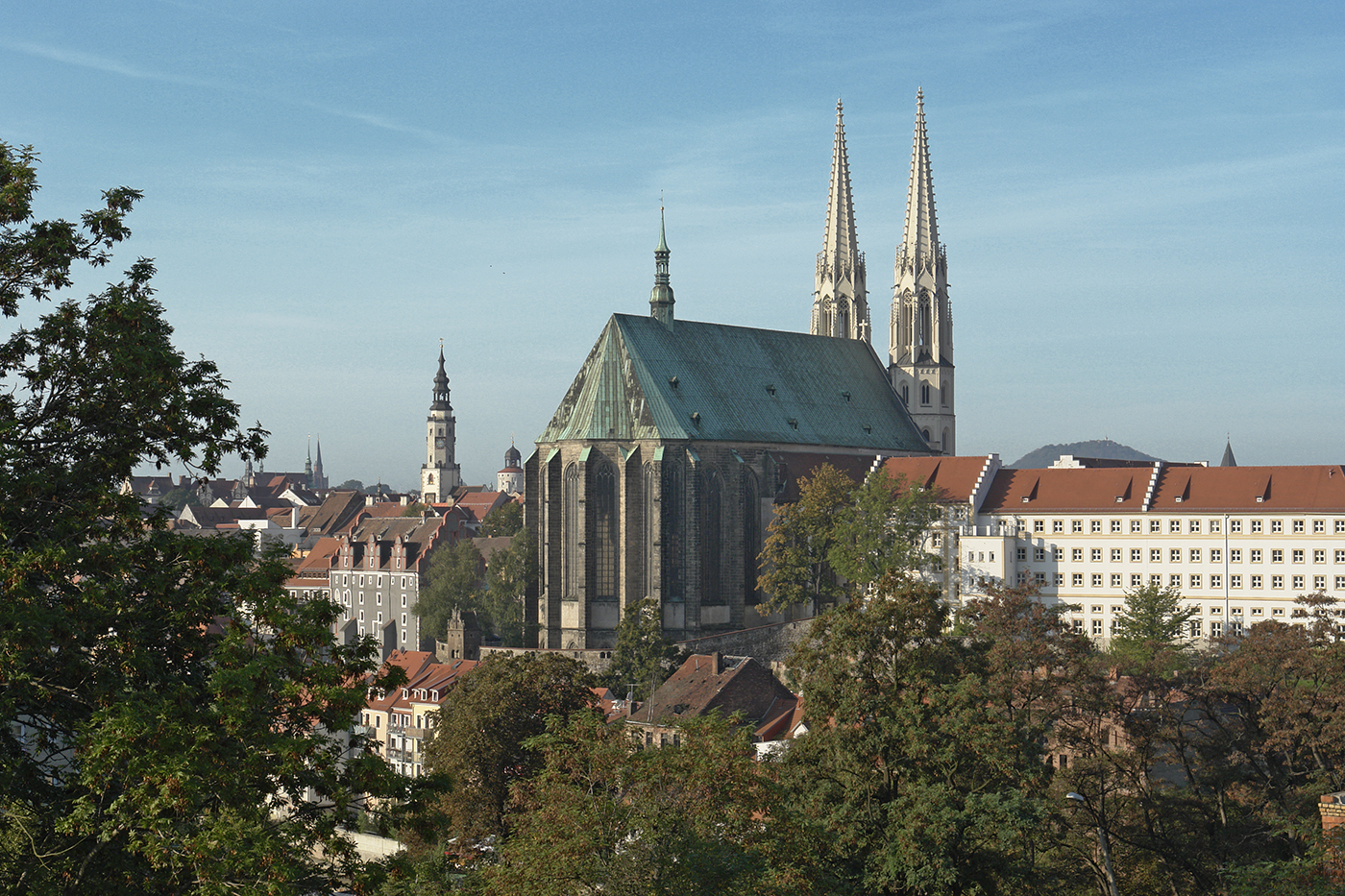
The historical city of Görlitz

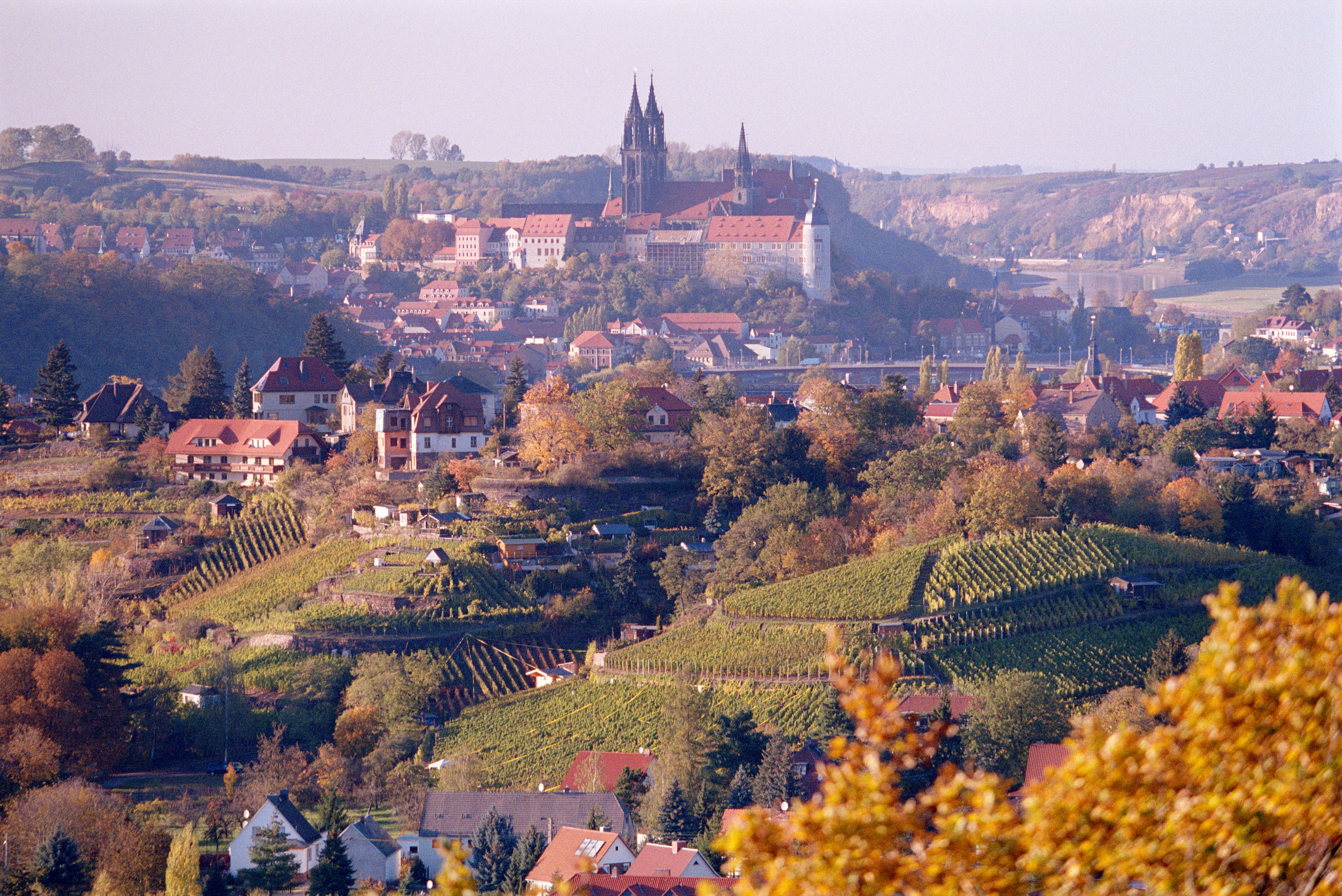
The Elbe valley with Meissen in the background

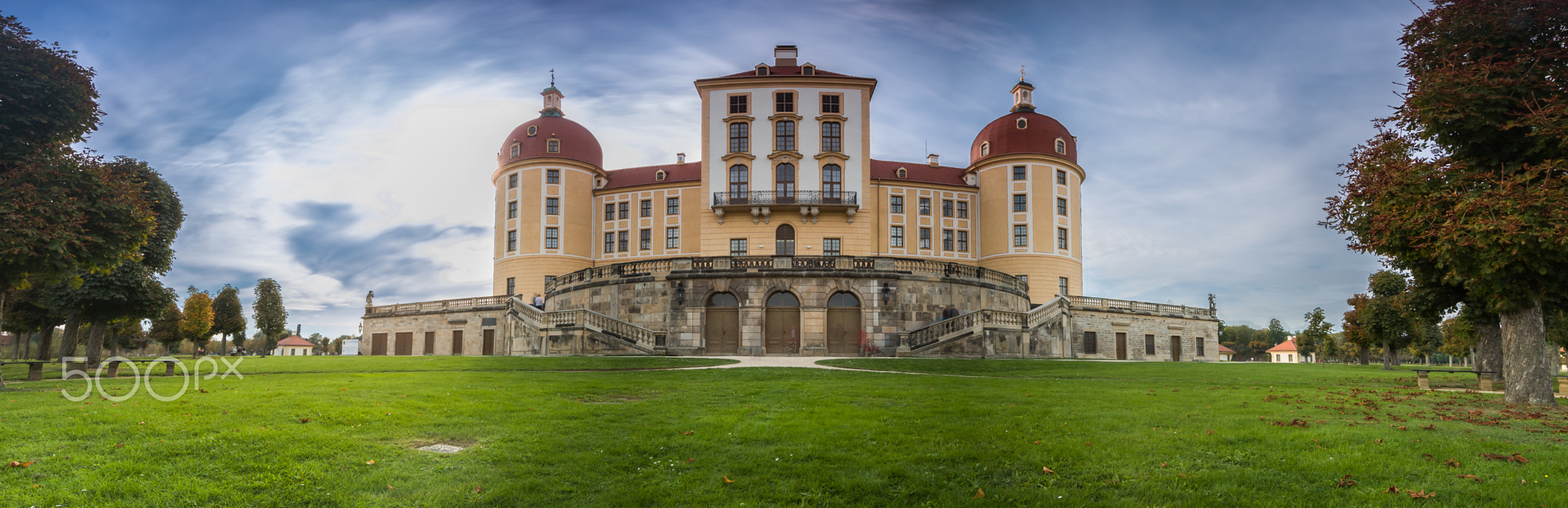
Saxony is home to numerous castles, such as Schloss Moritzburg north of Dresden.

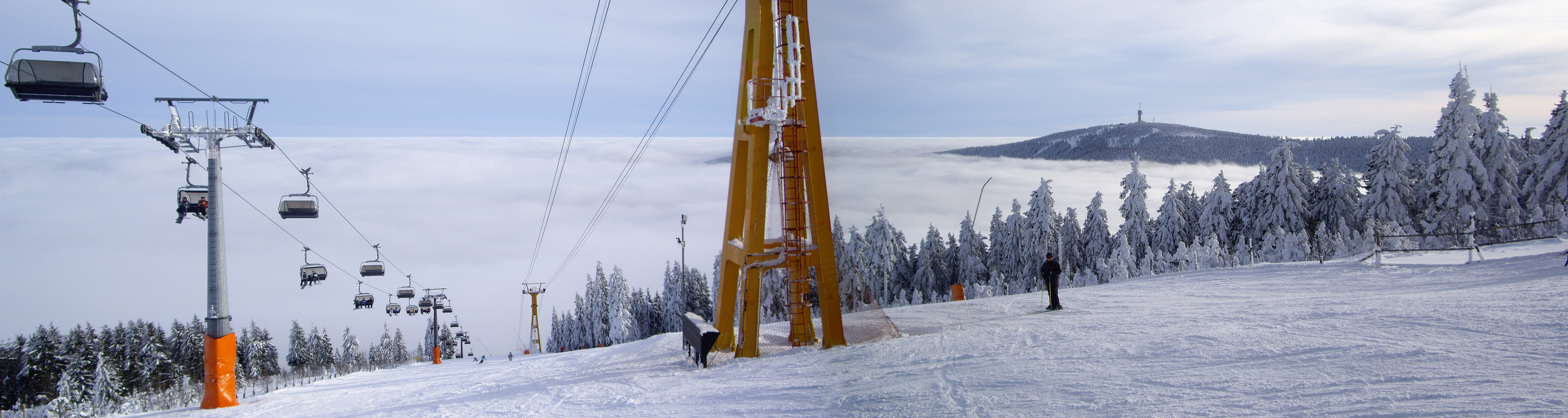
Oberwiesenthal, Ore Mountains

== Education and research ==
Saxony has four large universities, six Fachhochschulen (Universities of Applied Sciences) and six art schools.

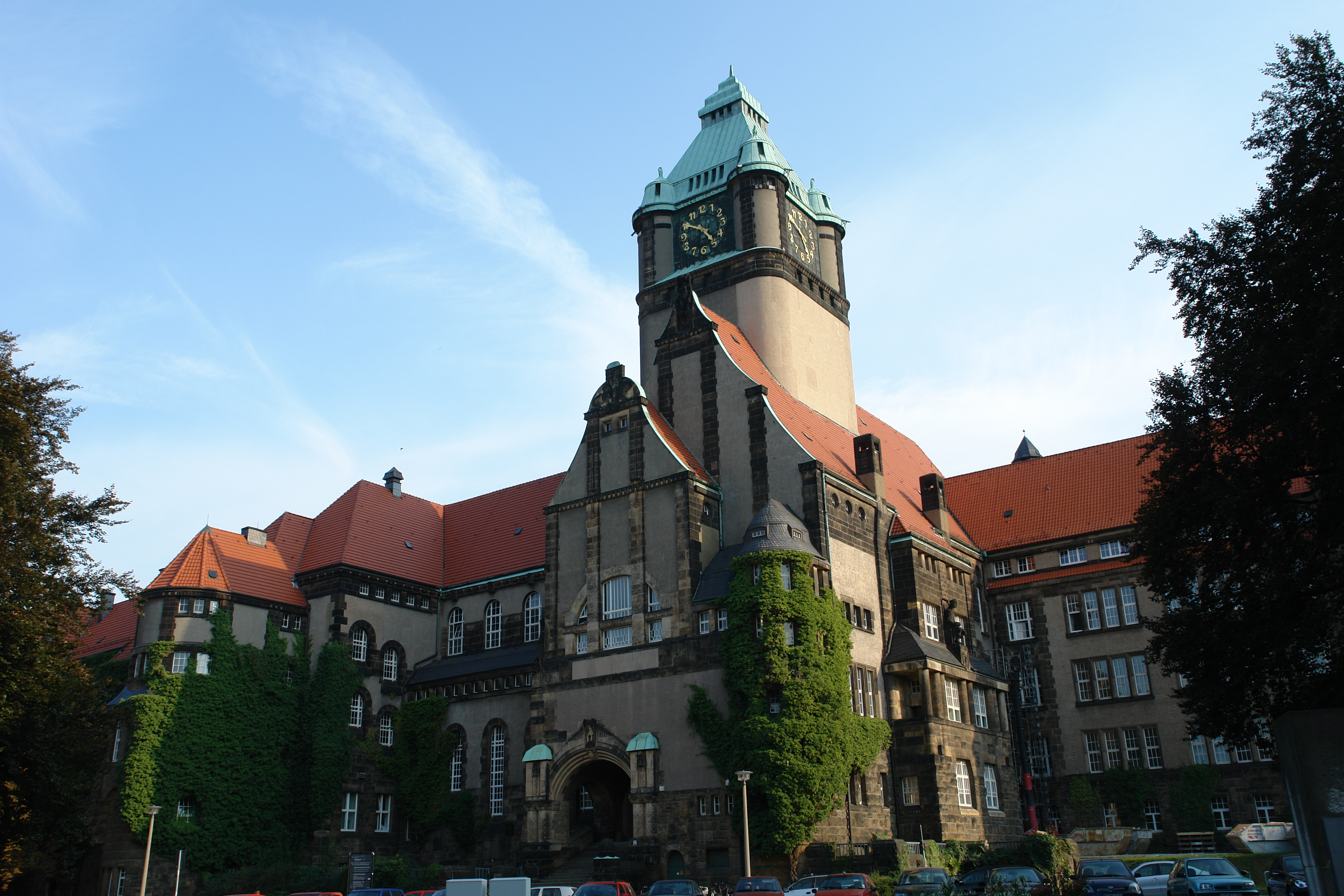
TU Dresden is the largest university in Saxony.

The Dresden University of Technology (TU Dresden), founded in 1828, is one of Germany's oldest universities, and one of the ten largest universities in Germany. It is a member of TU9, a consortium of nine leading German Institutes of Technology.

Leipzig University, founded in 1409, is one of the oldest universities in the world, and the second-oldest university (by consecutive years of existence) in Germany. Famous alumni include Leibniz, Goethe, Ranke, Nietzsche, Wagner, Cai Yuanpei, Angela Merkel, Raila Odinga, and Tycho Brahe; the university is, additionally, associated with nine Nobel laureates.

With over 11,000 students, the Chemnitz University of Technology is the third largest university in Saxony.

Established in 1765, the Freiberg University of Mining and Technology, located in the former mining town of Freiberg, is the oldest university of mining and metallurgy in the world.

Saxony is home to several Max Planck Institutes and research institutions of the Fraunhofer Society, and one of the two main campuses of the German National Library is located in Leipzig.

== Culture ==
Saxony is part of Central Germany as a cultural area. As such, throughout German history it has played an important role in shaping German culture.

=== Languages ===
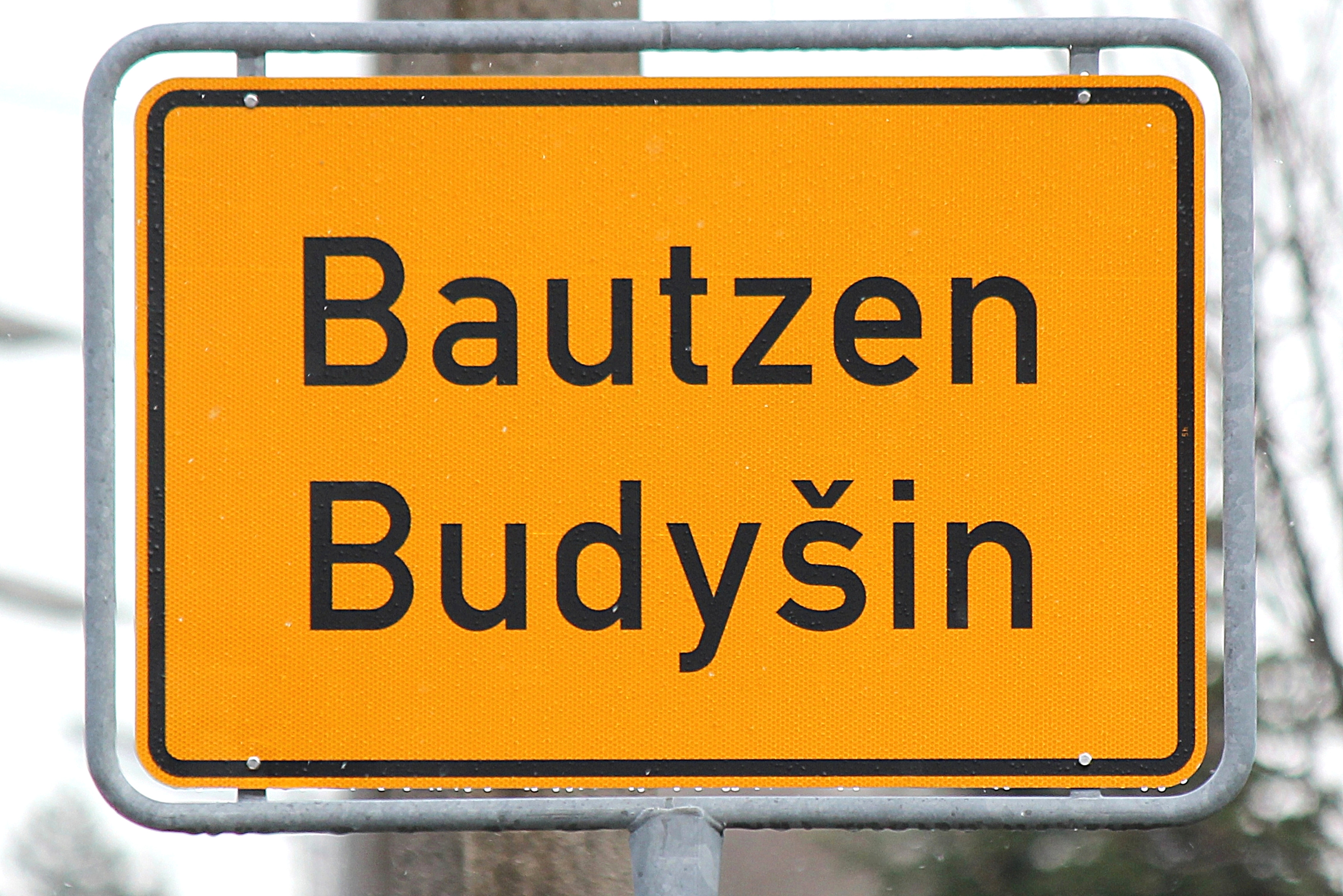
Boundary sign of Bautzen / Budyšin in German and Upper Sorbian. Many place names in eastern Saxony are derived from Sorbian.

The most common patois spoken in Saxony are combined in the group of "Thuringian and Upper Saxon dialects". Due to the inexact use of the term "Saxon dialects" in colloquial language, the Upper Saxon attribute has been added to distinguish it from Old Saxon and Low Saxon. Other German dialects spoken in Saxony are the dialects of the Ore Mountains, which have been affected by Upper Saxon dialects, and the dialects of the Vogtland, which are more affected by the East Franconian languages.

Upper Sorbian (a West Slavic language) is spoken in the parts of Upper Lusatia that are inhabited by the Sorbian minority. The Germans in Upper Lusatia speak distinct dialects of their own (Lusatian dialects).

=== Motherland of the Reformation ===
Saxony is often seen as the motherland of the Reformation. It was predominantly Lutheran Protestant from the Reformation until the late 20th century.

The Electoral Saxony, a predecessor of today's Saxony, was the original birthplace of the Reformation. The elector was Lutheran starting in 1525. The Lutheran church was organized through the late 1510s and the early 1520s. It was officially established in 1527 by John the Steadfast. Although some of the sites associated with Martin Luther also lie in the current state of Saxony-Anhalt (including Wittenberg, Eisleben and Mansfeld), today's Saxony is usually viewed as the formal successor to what used to be Luther's country back in the 16th century (i.e. the Electoral Saxony).

Martin Luther personally oversaw the Lutheran church in Saxony and shaped it consistently with his own views and ideas. The 16th, 17th and 18th centuries were heavily dominated by Lutheran orthodoxy. In addition, the Reformed faith made inroads with the so-called crypto Calvinists, but was strongly persecuted in an overwhelmingly Lutheran state. In the 17th century, Pietism became an important influence. In the 18th century, the Moravian Church was set up on Count von Zinzendorf's property at Herrnhut. From 1525, the rulers were traditionally Lutheran and widely acknowledged as defenders of the Protestant faith, although – beginning with Augustus II the Strong, who was required to convert to Roman Catholicism in 1697 in order to become King of Poland – its monarchs were exclusively Roman Catholic. That meant Augustus and the subsequent Electors of Saxony, who were Roman Catholic, ruled over a state with an almost entirely Protestant population.

In 1925, 90.3% of the Saxon population was Protestant, 3.6% was Roman Catholic, 0.4% was Jewish and 5.7% was placed in other religious categories.

After World War II, Saxony was incorporated into East Germany which pursued a policy of state atheism. After 45 years of Communist rule, the majority of the population has become unaffiliated. Nonetheless, even during this time Saxony remained an important place of religious dialogue and it was at Meissen where the agreement on mutual recognition between the German Evangelical Church and the Church of England was signed in 1988.

=== Sports ===
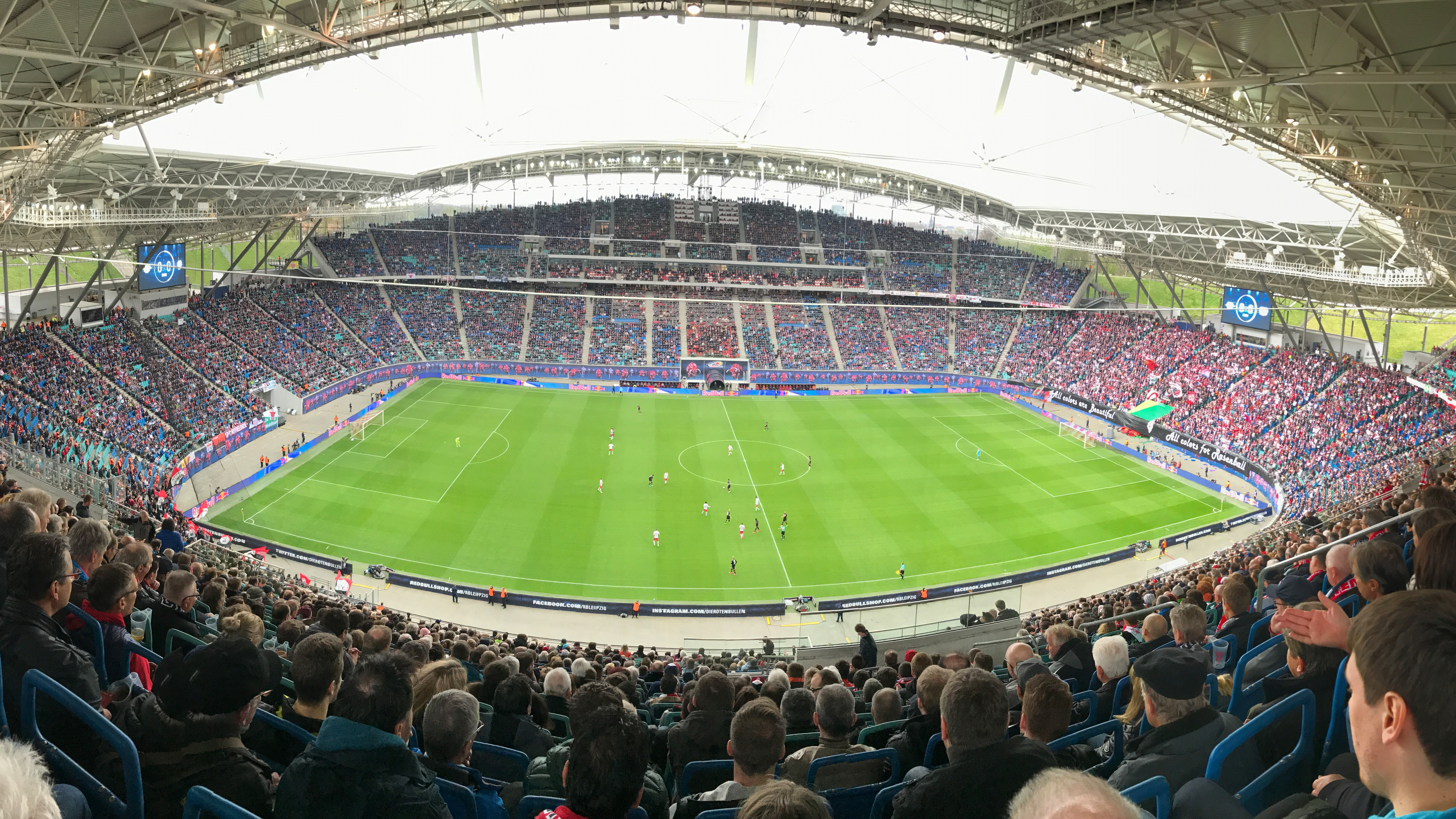
Red Bull Arena in Leipzig

In 2020, there were 4,447 registered sports clubs of various disciplines with over 600,000 members in Saxony. The most popular sport in Saxony is football. With RB Leipzig there is one Saxon team playing in the Bundesliga as well as the European Champions League. Leipzig is notable for a longstanding football tradition, a Leipzig team having been the first national football champion in German history. Another popular sport is handball with SC DHfK Leipzig playing in the Bundesliga. On a local level sports such as table tennis, cycling, mountaineering and volleyball are popular.

==== Rock climbing ====
Saxony prides itself to have been one of the first places in the world where modern recreational rock climbing was developed. Falkenstein rock in the area of Bad Schandau is considered to be the place were the German rock climbing tradition started in 1864.

==== Winter sports ====
The Ore Mountains in southern Saxony are a traditional center for winter sports, and there are a number of training facilities for the German Winter Olympics team in the region. Thus, climate change poses a certain threat to the development of the region's winter sports industry.

The ski resort of Oberwiesenthal is the highest town of Germany, at an altitude of 900 m, though the surrounding mountains do not reach the same height as those found in the alpine areas of Southern Germany.

=== Art ===
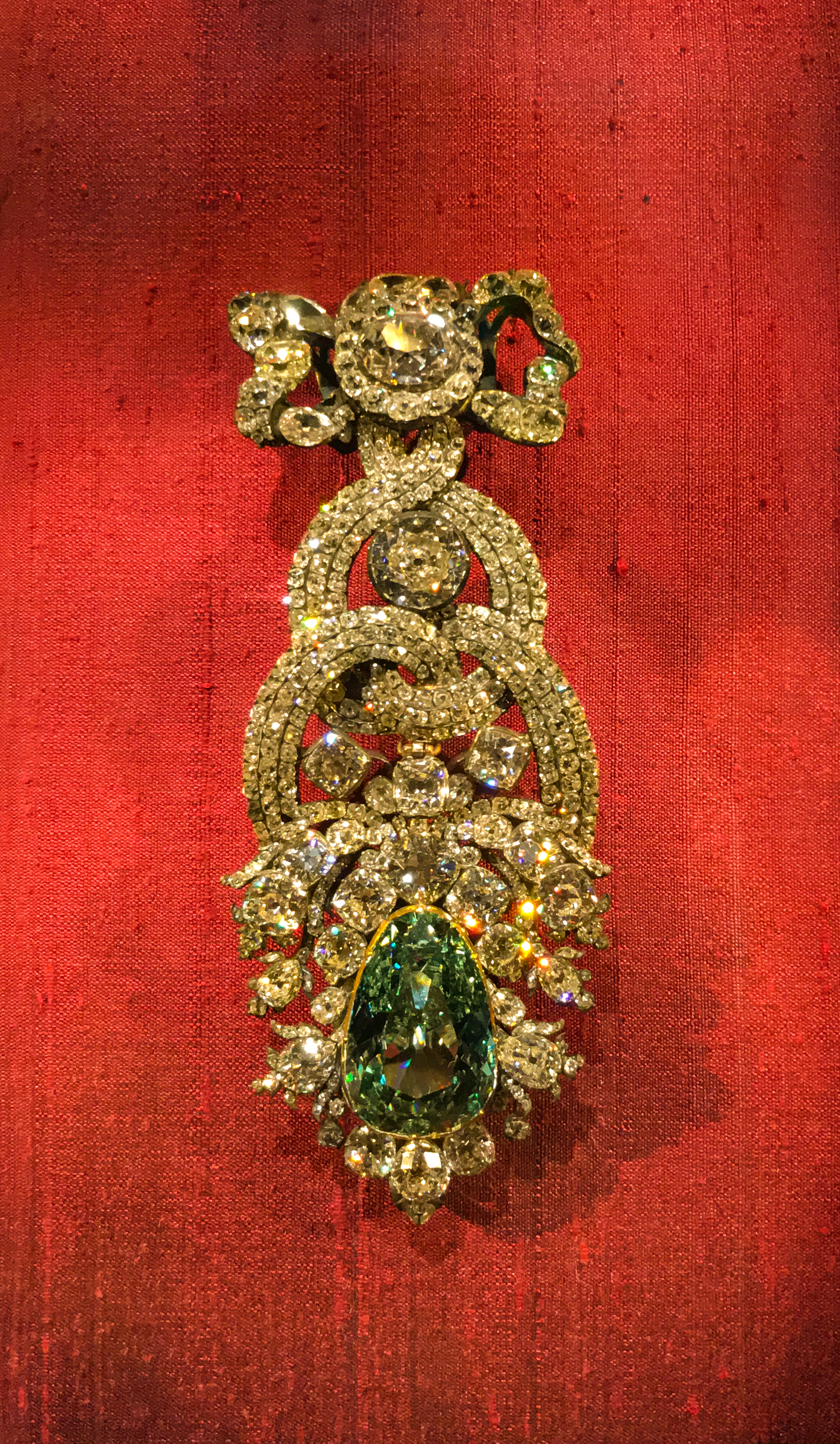
The 'Dresden Green Diamond' – the largest natural green diamond – is part of the collection of the Green Vault.

The two major cultural centers of Saxony are Dresden and Leipzig. The two cities have each a unique character which is reflecting the role they played throughout Saxon and German history, Dresden being a political center while Leipzig has been a major trading city. Thus, Dresden is well known for the art collections of the former Saxon kings (Dresden State Art Collections with the Green Vault and Zwinger as the most well-known parts).

Leipzig on the other hand never had a royal court, so its culture is borne largely by its citizens. The city is famous for its relationship with classical music and names like Johann Sebastian Bach, Mendelssohn or Wagner are linked to it. Over the past decades the city became famous for its modern art scene, most notably the Neue Leipziger Schule (New Leipzig School) with artists such as Neo Rauch.

=== Porcelain ===
Saxony was the first place in Europe to develop and produce white porcelain, a luxury good until then imported only from China. The Meissen Porcelain manufactory has been producing porcelain since 1710. It is one of the world's leading porcelain manufacturers and one of the oldest and most internationally known German luxury brands.

=== Cuisine ===
Saxon cuisine encompasses regional cooking traditions of Saxony. In general the cuisine is very hearty and features many peculiarities of Mid-Germany such as a great variety of sauces which accompany the main dish and the fashion to serve potato dumplings (Klöße/Knödel) as a side dish instead of potatoes, pasta or rice. Also much freshwater fish is used in Saxon cuisine. The area around Dresden is home to the easternmost wine region in Germany (see: Saxony (wine region)).

=== Anthem ===
Saxony (as other German states) has its own anthem, dating back to the monarchy of the 19th century. 'Gott segne Sachsenland' (God save Saxony) is based on the melody of God save the King.

== Transport ==
=== Air ===
The state has two major international airports:

- Leipzig/Halle Airport which provides flights to other parts of Germany and other European destinations. The airport also serves as the main European hub for cargo flights operated by DHL Aviation and the main hub for AeroLogic.
- Dresden Airport also provides flights to other parts of Germany and other European destinations.

== See also ==
- Saxony (wine region)
- States of Germany
