= CDU Saxony =

CDU Saxony CDU Sachsen
- Abbreviation: CDU
- Chairman: Michael Kretschmer
- Secretary-General: Tom Unger
- Founded: 21 July 1945; 81 years ago
- Headquarters: Dresden
- Membership: 8,700 (2025)
- Ideology: Conservatism (German); Christian democracy
- Political position: Centre-right
- National affiliation: CDU/CSU
- International affiliation: Centrist Democrat International; International Democracy Union
- Colours: Turquoise (official) (Note: Since September 2023); Black (customary)
- Landtag of Saxony: 41 / 120

Party flag

Website
- cdu-sachsen.de

The CDU Saxony (German: CDU Sachsen) is the regional state association of the Christian Democratic Union of Germany (CDU) in the Free State of Saxony, Germany. As the state branch of the CDU in Saxony, the party has been the dominant party in the state since German reunification. The CDU has provided every Minister-President since 1990. With 8,700 members, it was the second-largest state branch of any party in Saxony and the largest CDU state branch in East Germany in 2025. Michael Kretschmer has been the state chairman since 9 December 2017.

== History ==
=== Founding ===
As early as 10 June 1945, earlier than the Western Allies in their sectors, the Soviet Military Administration in Germany (SMAD) had permitted the establishment of anti-fascist democratic parties in the Soviet occupation zone in order to influence the party formation process in Germany via the party headquarters in Berlin.

The CDU Saxony was founded on 21 July 1945, in Dresden as the Christian Social People's Party. On21 August, at the request of the Soviet Military Administration in Germany (SMAD), it was renamed the Christian Democratic Union of Germany and licensed as a state party. Hugo Hickmann was elected as its first chairman, with Friedrich Koring and Otto Freitag as his deputies. The first regular party congress took place on 23-24 February 1946. Hickmann and his deputies were confirmed, and Franz Jensch was elected as an additional deputy chairman.

In its early days, the CDU in Saxony, like its sister parties in the West, pursued a Christian-social policy aimed at parliamentary democracy. It advocated for German reunification and was in constant conflict with the KPD/SED and its claim to leadership, which was supported by the Soviet Military Administration in Germany (SMAD).

On 13 June 1946, the Soviet Military Administration in Germany (SMAD) appointed a Consultative Assembly as a preliminary parliament. The CDU in Saxony was allocated only 10 of the 70 seats. The majority were held by members of the Socialist Unity Party of Germany (SED).

The Soviet Military Administration in Germany (SMAD) systematically hindered the party's development and its recruitment efforts. While the CDU was permitted to participate in the local elections of spring 1946, its organizational base was noticeably weakened by the delayed approval of local and district branches. Sergei Ivanovich Tyulpanov, head of the SMAD's censorship and propaganda department, issued a secret order instructing the SMAD's regional departments "not to formally prohibit the establishment of bourgeois party groups." Instead, "various formal pretexts" were to be found "to continue limiting their number". The effect of this policy was evident in the development of the CDU's local branches in Saxony. Although the establishment of CDU local branches was largely completed by the end of 1946, a significant number were not allowed to engage in political activity.

Year	Number of local groups	Number of registered	Number not registered
December 1945	272		
August 1946	1,019	592	427
December 1946	1,345	753	592
December 1947	1,219	801	318
December 1947	1,342		

The CDU was only able to field candidates in 20% of municipalities for the 1946 local elections, while the SED was permitted to participate nationwide. The democratic parties were also clearly disadvantaged with regard to the allocation of paper and printing capacity. This affected leaflets and posters, but especially the CDU newspaper Die Union, whose circulation was artificially kept low through paper allocations.

This policy continued in the Saxont state elections on 20 October 1946. Nevertheless, the CDU received 23.3% of the vote and 28 seats in the Landtag of Saxony. Given the circumstances of the election, the fact that the SED did not achieve an absolute majority was considered a serious defeat.

Substantive party work was subject to monitoring by the Soviet Military Administration in Germany (SMAD) and the Socialist Unity Party of Germany (SED). A prerequisite for registration was the willingness to cooperate within the Democratic Bloc. This bloc had been established at the state level in Saxony on 29 August 1945, and comprised the four registered parties. The bloc served to coordinate the political positions of the parties and acted as an instrument by which the SMAD prevented effective opposition to the SED. The SMAD was also represented by liaison officers at all meetings of the CDU parliamentary group in the state parliament. Confidential consultation was thus impossible.

The SMAD also influenced the personnel policy of the party. For example, the CDU Saxony's state manager, Hermann Voigt, was forced to resign in October 1946 under pressure from the SMAD.

Cooperation between the CDU state associations was also limited. At the level of the Soviet occupation zone (SBZ), the Christian Democratic Union of Germany ( CDU) existed in East Germany. However, a unified German CDU was not possible due to the licensing regulations of the occupying powers. Until the Gleichschaltung (coordination) of the East German CDU, the nationwide coordination of the Union's political work took place in the "Zonal Liaison Committee." CDU representatives from the SBZ were prevented from participating in this committee by the Soviet Military Administration in Germany (SMAD).

=== Gleichschaltung and Block Party ===
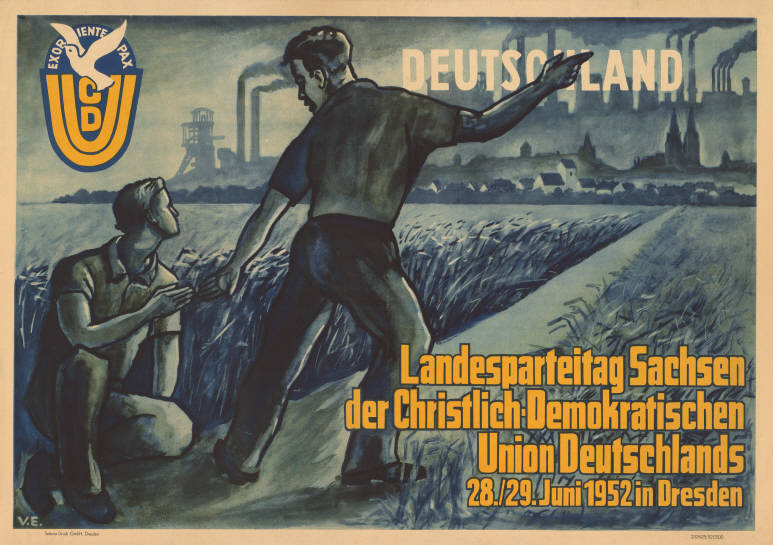
Invitation poster for the state party conference 1952

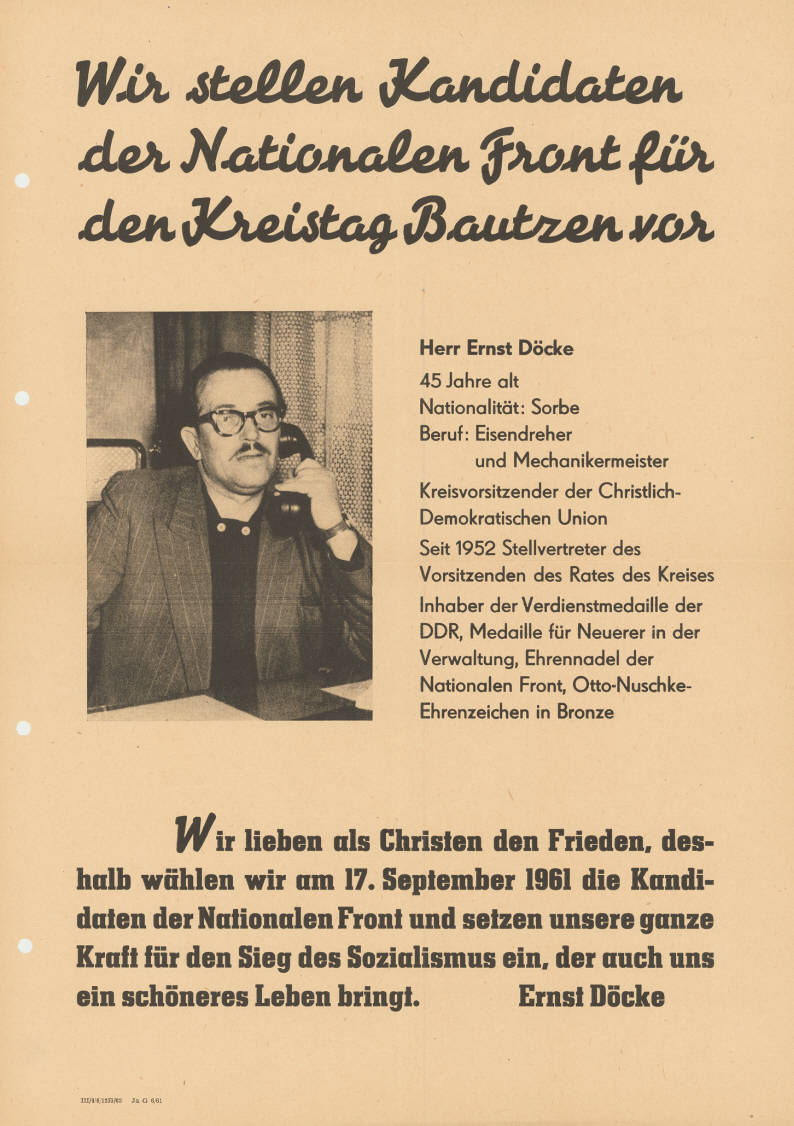
Election advertisement for a CDU candidate of the National Front, 1961

With the removal of Jakob Kaiser as chairman of the CDU in the Soviet occupation zone, the possibilities for party work in Saxony were further restricted. From February 1948 onward, only CDU meetings were permitted in Saxony, and only after the Soviet Military Administration (SMAD) had approved the speeches and statements beforehand. This was intended to prevent expressions of solidarity with Kaise. Hickmann pursued a policy of concessions and compromises, attempting to utilize the party's diminishing freedoms. Nevertheless, the Saxon CDU emphasized its independence. For example, in 1948, the CDU in the Landtag rejected the nationalization of cinemas and demanded free elections for 1949.

Hickmann's questioning of the SED's leading role in the Saxon state executive committee on 6 January 1950, and his warning that the SED's policies would lead to the division of Germany, triggered fierce attacks against him. The SED denounced him as a "lackey of the West German CDU" and of "Anglo-American imperialism." On 23 January 1950, the pressure intensified: SED members occupied the CDU's state headquarters in Dresden and threatened to murder Hickmann. On 30 January 1950, Hickmann resigned from his party offices. Many delegates and executive committee members subsequently fled to the West, including the state association's treasurer, Walter Bergmann; the head of the CDU training center in Blankenburg/Harz, Josef Bock; the state parliament member Carl Günther Ruland; and Finance Minister Gerhard Rohner. Other board members, such as Bernhard Singer, remained in East Germany but lost their party offices and mandates. In the summer of 1950, Hickmann was expelled from the Saxon CDU, which by then had been largely brought into line with Nazi ideology.

The CDU members who fled from Saxony organized themselves in the West in the Landsmannschaft Sachsen der Exil-CDU (Association of Exiled CDU Members of Saxony). Ernst-Günter Haß was the spokesman for the Landsmannschaft from 1950 to 1962.

With Rudolph Schulze (supply and agriculture) and Carl Ulbricht (finance minister), the CDU Saxony, which had become a bloc party, continued to provide two ministers in the Saxon cabinet.

With the dissolution of the states in East Germany, the history of the CDU in Saxony also came to an end in 1990 with German reunification. For further information on the history of the CDU as a bloc party, see here.

=== After the fall of the Berlin Wall ===
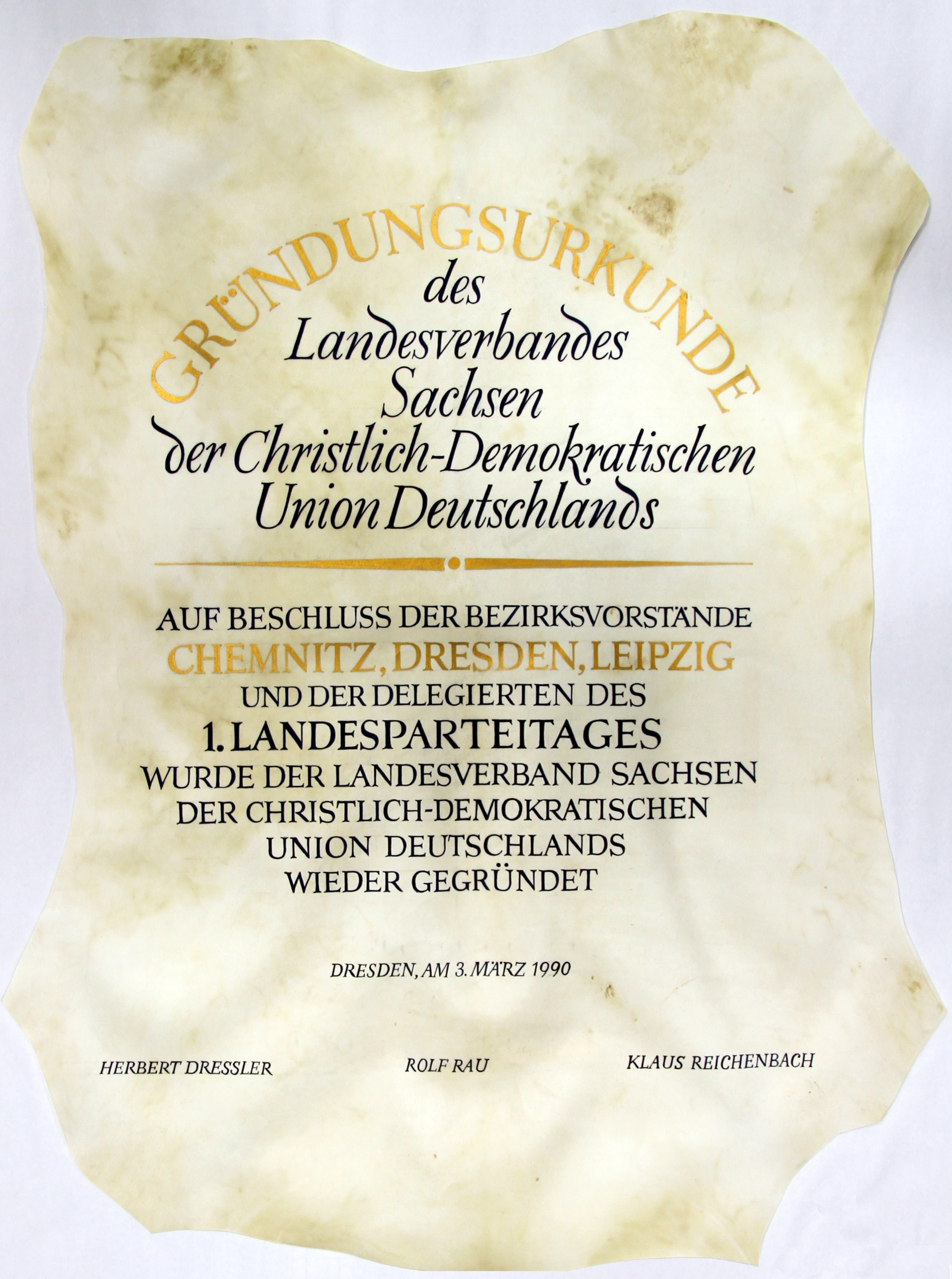
Founding document of the CDU Saxony in 1990

The fall of the Berlin Wall enabled the East German CDU to act independently from the bloc party and resume politics. On 3 March 1990, the Saxony state association was re-established at its first state party conference in Dresden, and Klaus Reichenbach was elected chairman with 82% of the delegates' votes. His opponent, Arnold Vaatz, received 18%.

The Saxon state association of Democratic Awakening, founded on 23 June 1990, and chaired by Horst Rasch, was merged into the CDU by a resolution of the majority faction of the Saxon Democratic Awakening on 28 July and by a resolution of the CDU's second state party conference on 1 September 1990. The state association of the Democratic Farmers' Party (DBD) was also merged into the CDU on the same day.

In the state election on 14 October 1990, the CDU won an absolute majority of the votes and 92 seats in the Landtag of Saxony. On 27 October, Kurt Biedenkopf was elected Minister-President by the state parliament. As of May 2020, Biedenkopf's successors were also exclusively CDU politicians (list here). Biedenkopf was also chairman of the CDU Saxony from 1991 to 1995.

In the state election on 11 September 1994, the CDU received 58.1% of the vote and 77 of the 120 seats in the Landtag of Saxony. This was their best result to date in Saxony and their best result in any state election in Germany. Biedenkopf remained Minister-President; in 1995, he relinquished the state chairmanship of the CDU to Fritz Hähle.

In the state election on 19 September 1999, the CDU received 56.9% of the votes and 76 seats in the Landtag of Saxony.

With over 60 percent of the seats, the CDU in Saxony was the largest CDU parliamentary group in a state parliament in Germany (relative to the total number of seats) in both the second and third legislative periods.

On 15 September 2001, Georg Milbradt became chairman of the CDU Saxony at a special party conference. Biedenkopf had favored Agriculture Minister Steffen Flath; Milbradt won the contested election against Flath. On 16 January 2002, Biedenkopf announced his resignation as Minister-President, effective 18 April 2002. In March 2002, the CDU Saxony nominated Milbradt as its candidate for the office of Minister-President; on 18 April 2002, Milbradt was elected by the state parliament (→ First Milbradt cabinet).

In the state election on 19 September 2004, the CDU received only 41.1% of the vote and 55 of the 124 seats in the Landtag of Saxony. They were one seat short of a coalition with the FDP. The CDU and SPD formed a coalition and on 10 November 2004, re-elected Milbradt as Minister-President (→ Second Milbradt cabinet).

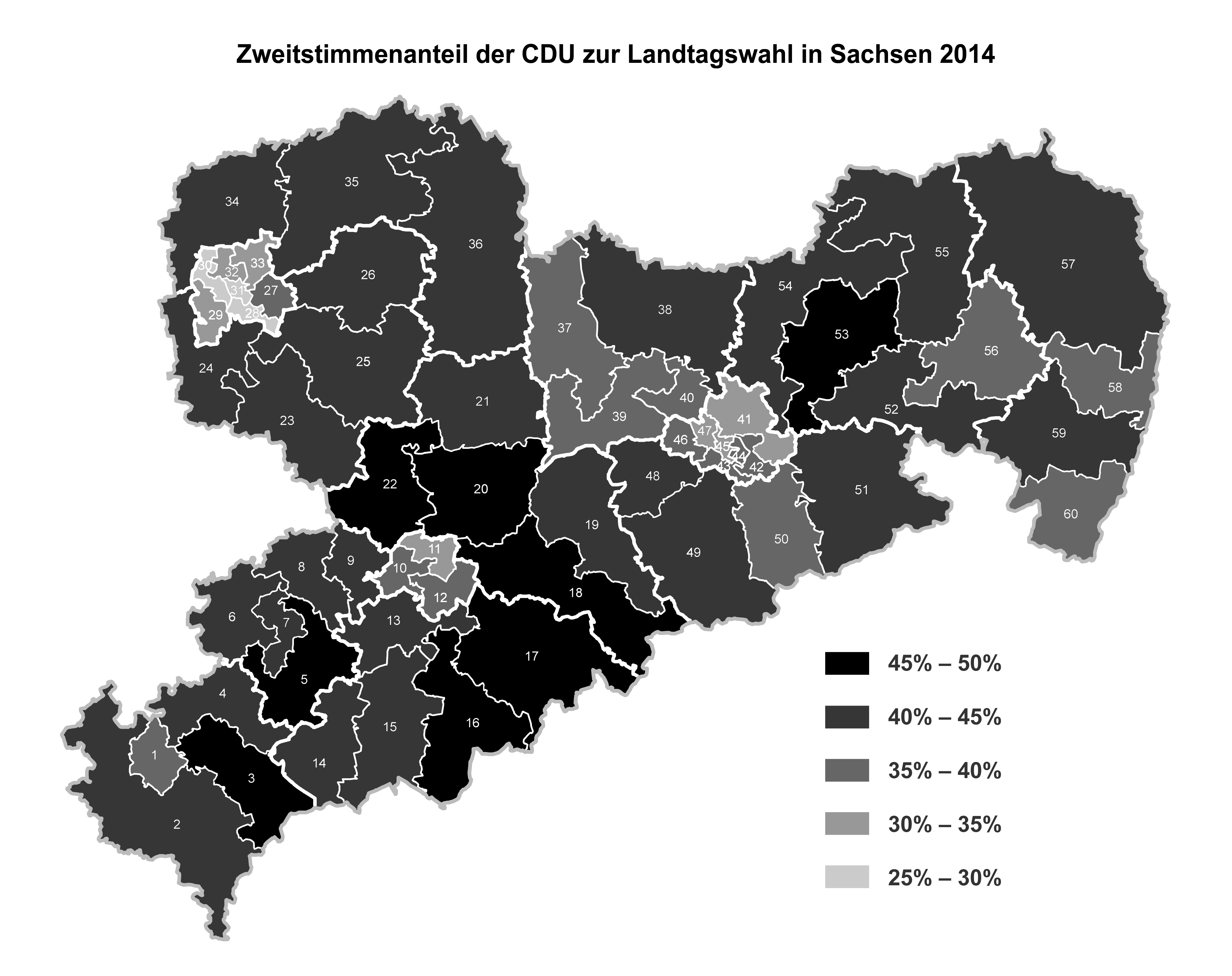
CDU's share of second votes in the 2014 Saxony state election

Stanislaw Tillich became the new CDU state chairman on 24 May 2008, and also Minister-President of the Free State of Saxony on 28 May 2008.

In the 2009 Saxony state election, the CDU, now with Tillich as its lead candidate for the first time, received 40.1% of the vote. It won 58 of the 60 directly elected constituencies. The CDU and FDP in Saxony formed a Black-yellow coalition (Second Tillich cabinet).

The CDU's lead candidate for the state election on 31 August 2014, was Tillich who stood for a third term. The CDU won 59 of the 60 direct constituencies and received 39.4% of the second votes. Due to the FDP's departure from the Landtag of Saxony, the CDU had to find a new coalition partner. After exploratory talks with the Greens and the SPD, the CDU and SPD formed a coalition. The coalition agreement was signed by both sides in the State Parliament building on 10 November 2014. Minister-President Stanislaw Tillich was elected by the members of the List of members of the 6th Landtag of Saxony (2014–2019) on 12 November 2014 , and the Third Tillich cabinet was appointed on 13 November 2014.

In October 2017, Stanislaw Tillich announced his resignation as Minister-president and State Chairman. He proposed Michael Kretschmer as his successor for both positions. On 9 December 2017, Kretschmer was elected the new State Chairman at the 32nd Party conference in Löbau with 90.1 percent of the vote. He was elected Minister-President of the Free State of Saxony on 13 December 2017 in the Landtag of Saxony (First Kretschmer cabinet). Despite significant losses, the CDU again emerged as the strongest party in the 2019 Saxony state election. However, the CDU-SPD coalition no longer held a majority, leading to the formation of a CDU-Green-SPD coalition (Second Kretschmer cabinet). In the 2024 Saxony state election, the CDU narrowly defeated the Alternative for Germany (AfD) to become the strongest party once again. Subsequently, Minister-President Kretschmer formed a CDU-SPD minority government (Third Kretschmer cabinet).

At the local level, there are informal collaborations with the AfD.

== Organisation ==
=== State party conference ===
Number	Date	Location	State chair	Election result	Secretary-General	Election result
1st State Party Congress	3 March 1990	Dresden	Klaus Reichenbach	82.4%		
2nd State Party Congress	1 September 1990	Dresden				
3rd State Party Congress	22–23 June 1991	Hoyerswerda				
4th State Party Congress	26 October 1991	Görlitz				
1st Special Party Congress	7 December 1991	Annaberg	Kurt Biedenkopf	80.3%		
5th State Party Congress	10 October 1992	Riesa				
6th State Party Congress	9–10 October 1993	Chemnitz	Kurt Biedenkopf	98.0%		
7th State Party Congress	13 August 1994	Dresden				
8th State Party Congress	28 October 1995	Pirna	Fritz Hähle	87.0%	Steffen Flath	85.4%
9th State Party Congress	26 October 1996	Delitzsch				
10th State Party Congress	25 October 1997	Markneukirchen	Fritz Hähle	86.0%	Steffen Flath	80.8%
11th State Party Congress	12 December 1998	Riesa				
12th State Party Congress	10 July 1999	Leipzig				
13th State Party Congress	6 November 1999	Döbeln	Fritz Hähle	60.7%	Frank Kupfer	87.1%
14th State Party Congress	25 November 2000	Rietschen				
15th State Party Congress	15 September 2001	Glauchau	Georg Milbradt	57.7%	Hermann Winkler	75.6%
2nd Special Party Congress	9 March 2002	Dresden				
16th State Party Conference (cancelled)	24 August 2002	Leipzig				
16th State Party Congress	20 September 2003	Grimma	Georg Milbradt	89.9%	Hermann Winkler	81.8%
17th State Party Congress	6 August 2004	Chemnitz				
3rd Special Party Congress	6 November 2004	Dresden				
18th State Party Congress	23 April 2005	Bad Düben				
19th State Party Congress	5 November 2005	Schwarzenberg/Erzgeb.	Georg Milbradt	76.9%	Michael Kretschmer	88.5%
20th State Party Congress	7 October 2006	Pirna				
21st State Party Congress	15 September 2007	Mittweida	Georg Milbradt	73.8%	Michael Kretschmer	83.0%
22nd State Party Congress	24 May 2008	Zwickau	Stanislaw Tillich	97.7%	Michael Kretschmer	82.7%
23rd State Party Congress	16 May 2009	Leipzig				
4th Special Party Congress	19 September 2009	Dresden				
24th State Party Congress	14 November 2009	Chemnitz	Stanislaw Tillich	94.2%	Michael Kretschmer	82.4%
25th State Party Congress	6 November 2010	Bautzen				
26th State Party Congress	26 November 2011	Plauen	Stanislaw Tillich	89.6%	Michael Kretschmer	79.4%
27th State Party Congress	17 November 2012	Leipzig				
28th State Party Congress	9 November 2013	Chemnitz	Stanislaw Tillich	95.7%	Michael Kretschmer	82.6%
29th State Party Congress	28 June 2014	Dresden				
5th Special Party Congress	7 November 2014	Radebeul				
30th State Party Congress	14 November 2015	Neukieritzsch	Stanislaw Tillich	83.3%	Michael Kretschmer	78.8%
31st State Party Congress	5 November 2016	Glauchau				
32nd State Party Congress	9 December 2017	Löbau	Michael Kretschmer	90.1%	Alexander Dierks	83.3%

=== State Executive Committee ===
The state executive committee is, alongside the state party conference, the second governing body of the CDU Saxony. It manages the state association. Its members, elected by the state party conference, include the state chairman , three deputy chairmen, the general secretary, the treasurer, and 20 additional members. There are also other members by virtue of the statutes and those with an advisory function.

Chair	Michael Kretschmer
Deputy Chairs	Barbara Klepsch, Christian Hartmann, Steffen Zenner, Sandra Gockel
General Secretary	Tom Unger
Treasurer	Matthias Grahl
Member Representative	Bianca Erdmann-Reusch
Assessors	Sandra Bahn, Lutz Barthel, Georg-Ludwig von Breitenbuch, Marcel Gröschel, Heike Helbig, Jens Lehmann, Susan Leithoff, Gerald Otto, Sophie Pojar, Agata Reichel-Tomczak, Julien Reiter, Dr. Matthias Rößler, Dr. Christiane Schenderlein, Marko Schiemann, Thomas Schmidt, Armin Schuster, Michael Specht, Johanna Stampfer, Octavian Ursu, Stephan Weinrich
Members by virtue of the statutes	Michael Kretschmer, minister-president of Saxony Christian Hartmann, Chairman of the CDU parliamentary group in the Landtag of Saxony Alexander Dierks, President of the Landtag of Saxony Carsten Körber, Chairman of the Saxony regional group of the CDU/CSU fraktion in the Bundestag
Advisory members	Julian Schiebe, State Chairman of the Young Union Sandra Gockel, State Chairwoman of the Frauen-Union Alexander Krauß, State Chairman of the Christian Democratic Employees' Association Stephan Weinrich, State Chairman of the Association of Local Politicians of the CDU/CSU Nora Seitz, State Chairwoman of the Association of Small and Medium-Sized Businesses and the Economy Kai Hähner, State Chairman of the Union of Expellees, Resettlers and German Minorities of the CDU/CSU Frank Vogel, State Chairman of the Senioren-Union Lars Rohwer, State Chairman of the Evangelical Working Group of the CDU/CSU Marko Schiemann, State Chairman of the Federal Working Group of Christian Democratic Lawyers
Regular members	Michael Kretschmer, Deputy Federal Chairman of the National board of the CDU Jessica Steiner, Member of the CDU Federal Executive Committee Johannes Handschumacher, Chairman of the State Party Court Frank Hirche, Chairman of the State Association of Expellees and Late Resettlers in the Free State of Saxony/Silesian Lusatia Zinar Eibach, State Chairman of the Association of Christian Democratic Students Heiko Petzold, State Chairman of the organization Lesbians and Gays in the UnionMathias Kretschmer, State Chairman of the Catholic Working Group

At the state level, there are currently nine state-level expert committees that support the substantive work. They are appointed by the state executive committee for the duration of a legislative period.

State Expert Committee	Chair
Education and Science	Sandra Gockel
Europe	Martin Modschiedler
Family and Youth	Ines Saborowski
Health	Alexander Krauß
Interior	Ronny Wähner
Culture and Media	Andreas Nowak
Rural areas	Peter Jahr
Network policy and digital agenda	Nora Schneider
Sport	Wolf-Diedrich Rost
Environment and Energy	Sebastian Fischer
Economy and Innovation	Markus Reichel

=== District associations ===
The CDU Saxony is structured according to the administrative structure of the Free State of Saxony into 13 district associations, which in turn are made up of city, municipal and local associations.

District Association	Chair	Seat
Chemnitz District Association	Frank Heinrich	Chemnitz
Dresden District Association	Christian Hartmann	Dresden
Leipzig District Association	Andreas Nowak	Leipzig
Bautzen District Association	Michael Harig	Bautzen
Erzgebirge District Association	Frank Vogel	Annaberg-Buchholz
Görlitz District Association	Florian Oest	Görlitz
Leipzig District Association	Georg-Ludwig von Breitenbuch	Borna
Meissen District Association	Ulrich Reusch	Großenhain
Mittelsachsen District Association	Sven Liebhauser	Freiberg
Nordsachsen District Association	Christiane Schenderlein	Delitzsch
Sächsische Schweiz-Osterzgebirge District Association	Peter Darmstadt	Pirna
Vogtland District Association	Sören Voigt	Falkenstein
Zwickau District Association	Carsten Michaelis	Zwickau

=== Associations and special organizations ===
Associations and special organizations	Chair
Junge Union (JU)	Stefanie Franzl
Frauen-Union (FU)	Sandra Gockel
Christlich-Demokratische Arbeitnehmerschaft (CDA)	Alexander Krauß
Association of Local Politicians of the CDU/CSU (KPV)	Rico Anton
Mittelstands- und Wirtschaftsvereinigung (MIT)	Nora Seitz
Union of Expellees, Resettlers and German Minorities of the CDU/CSU (OMV)	Jörg Kiesewetter
Senioren-Union (SU)	Klaus Leroff
Special organization	Chair
Land-Union (LU)	Peter Jahr
Evangelischer Arbeitskreis (EAK)	Lars Rohwer
Federal Working Group of Christian Democratic Lawyers (LACDJ)	Marko Schiemann
Other group	Chair
Association of Christian Democratic Students (RCDS)	Zinar Eibach
Christian Democrats for Life (CDL)	Daniel Kästner
Working Group of Committed Catholics in the CDU (KA)	Mathias Kretschmer
Lesbians and Gays in the Union (LSU)	Heiko Petzold

== Policies ==
Currently, three major programmes describe the goals and positions of the CDU Saxony.

The political programme “Serving Saxony – Securing the Future. Innovation, Prosperity, Justice” describes the principles and program of the CDU Saxony and was adopted on 26 November 2011 at the 26th state party conference in Plauen.

The government program “With Courage. With Foresight. Together” for the years 2014–2019 was adopted at the 29th state party conference on 28 June 2014, in Dresden. It was the election program of the CDU Saxony for the state election on 31 August 2014.

Following the 2014 Saxony state election, the CDU found a coalition partner in the SPD Saxony for the 2014–2019 legislative period. Both parties agreed on the joint coalition agreement "Shaping Saxony's Future." The CDU membership approved the agreement unanimously at its 5th special party conference on 7 November 2014, in Radebeul, with two abstentions. The agreement was signed on 10 November 2014, at the State Parliament building in Dresden by the CDU state chairman and Minister-President Stanislaw Tillich, the CDU parliamentary group chairman Frank Kupfer, and the then SPD state and parliamentary group chairman Martin Dulig.

In addition to these three major programmes, the state executive committee and the state party conference adopt papers on current political issues at irregular intervals.

== Election results ==
=== Results of state elections ===
Results in Landtag elections
Year	Votes	Percent	Direct mandates	Seats in total	Top candidate
1990	1,417,332	53.8%	80 / 80	92 / 160	Kurt Biedenkopf
1994	1,199,883	58.1%	60 / 60	77 / 120	Kurt Biedenkopf
1999	1,231,254	56.9%	60 / 60	76 / 120	Kurt Biedenkopf
2004	855,203	41.1%	55 / 60	55 / 124	Georg Milbradt
2009	722,983	40.2%	58 / 60	58 / 132	Stanislaw Tillich
2014	645,344	39.4%	59 / 60	59 / 126	Stanislaw Tillich
2019	695,494	32.1%	41 / 60	45 / 119	Michael Kretschmer
2024	749,114	31.9%	27 / 60	41 / 120	Michael Kretschmer

=== Results of federal elections ===
Results of federal elections
Year	Votes	Percent	Direct mandates	Seats in total	Top candidate
1990	1,376,055	49.5%	21 / 21	21 / 40	Klaus Reichenbach
1994	1,229,313	48.0%	21 / 21	21 / 39	Angelika Pfeiffer
1998	945,199	32.7%	13 / 21	13 / 37	Arnold Vaatz
2002	868,167	33.6%	13 / 17	13 / 29	Michael Luther
2005	795,316	30.0%	14 / 17	14 / 36	Arnold Vaatz
2009	800,898	35.6%	16 / 16	16 / 35	Thomas de Maizière
2013	994,601	42.6%	16 / 16	17 / 33	Thomas de Maizière
2017	665,688	26.9%	12 / 16	12 / 38	Thomas de Maizière
2021	422,879	17.2%	4 / 16	7 / 38	Marco Wanderwitz

=== Results of the European elections ===
Elections to the European Parliament
Year	Votes	Percent	Seats	Lead candidate
1994	937,424	39.2%	3 / 4	Jürgen Schröder
1999	852,891	45.9%	3 / 4	Jürgen Schröder
2004	570,622	36.5%	2 / 5	Lutz Goepel
2009	567,231	35.3%	2 / 6	Hermann Winkler
2014	559,799	34.5%	2 / 4	Hermann Winkler
2019	474,730	23.0%	1 / 4	Peter Jahr
2024	487,909	21.8%	1 / 4	Oliver Schenk

== Leadership ==
State Chairman	Term
Hugo Hickmann	1945–1950
Otto Freitag	1950 (provisional)
Josef Rambo	1950
Magnus Dedek	1950–1952
From 1952 to 1990, there was no state of Saxony
Klaus Reichenbach	1990–1991
Berthold Rink	1991 (provisional)
Kurt Biedenkopf	1991–1995
Fritz Hähle	1995–2001
Georg Milbradt	2001–2008
Stanislaw Tillich	2008–2017
Michael Kretschmer	since 2017

=== Secretaries-General ===
(since 1990)

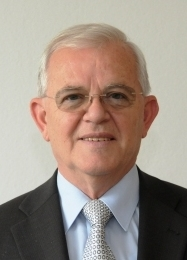
Erich Iltgen (27 October 1990 to 28 September 2009)

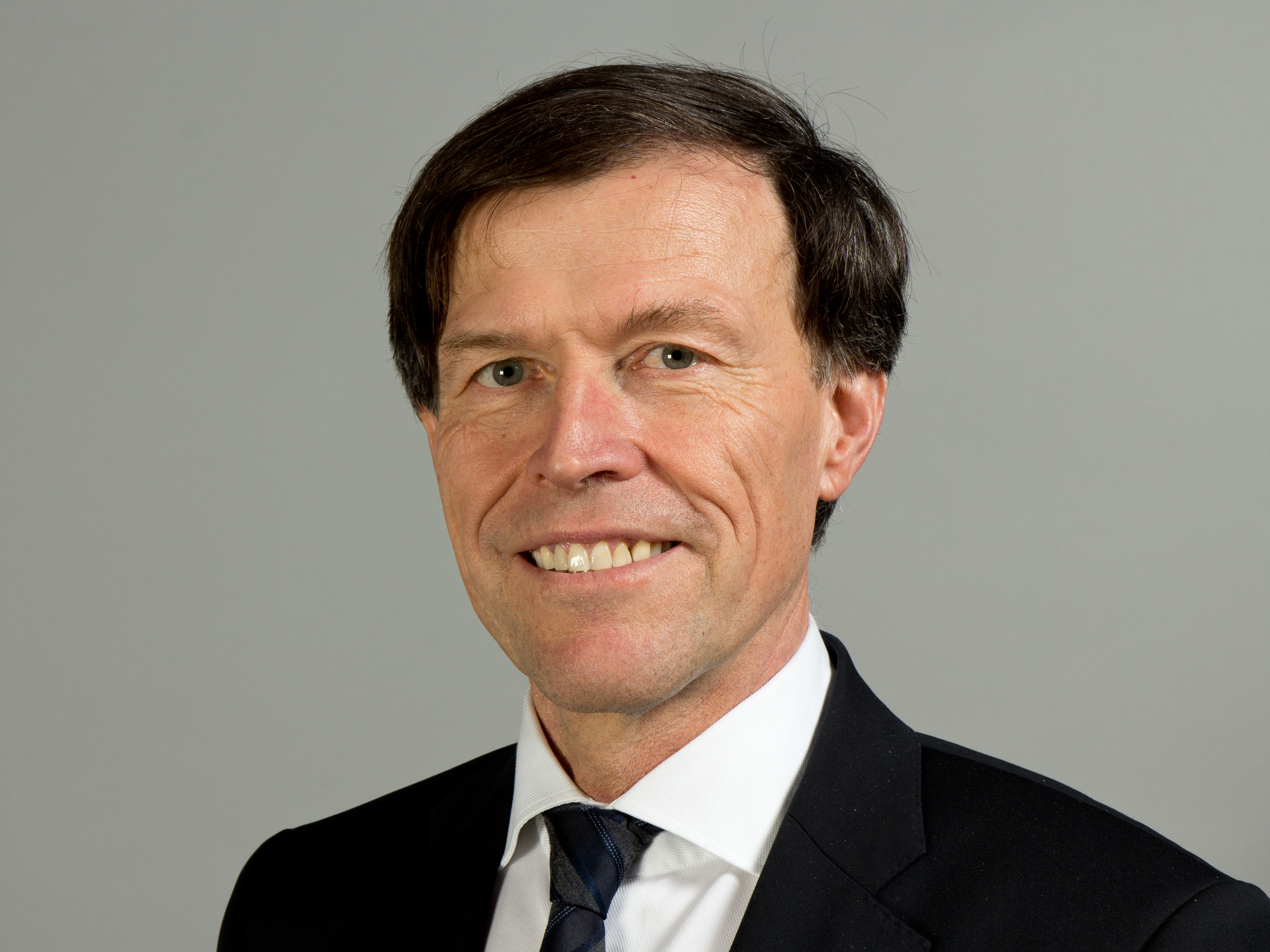
Matthias Rößler (29 September 2009 to 30 September 2024)

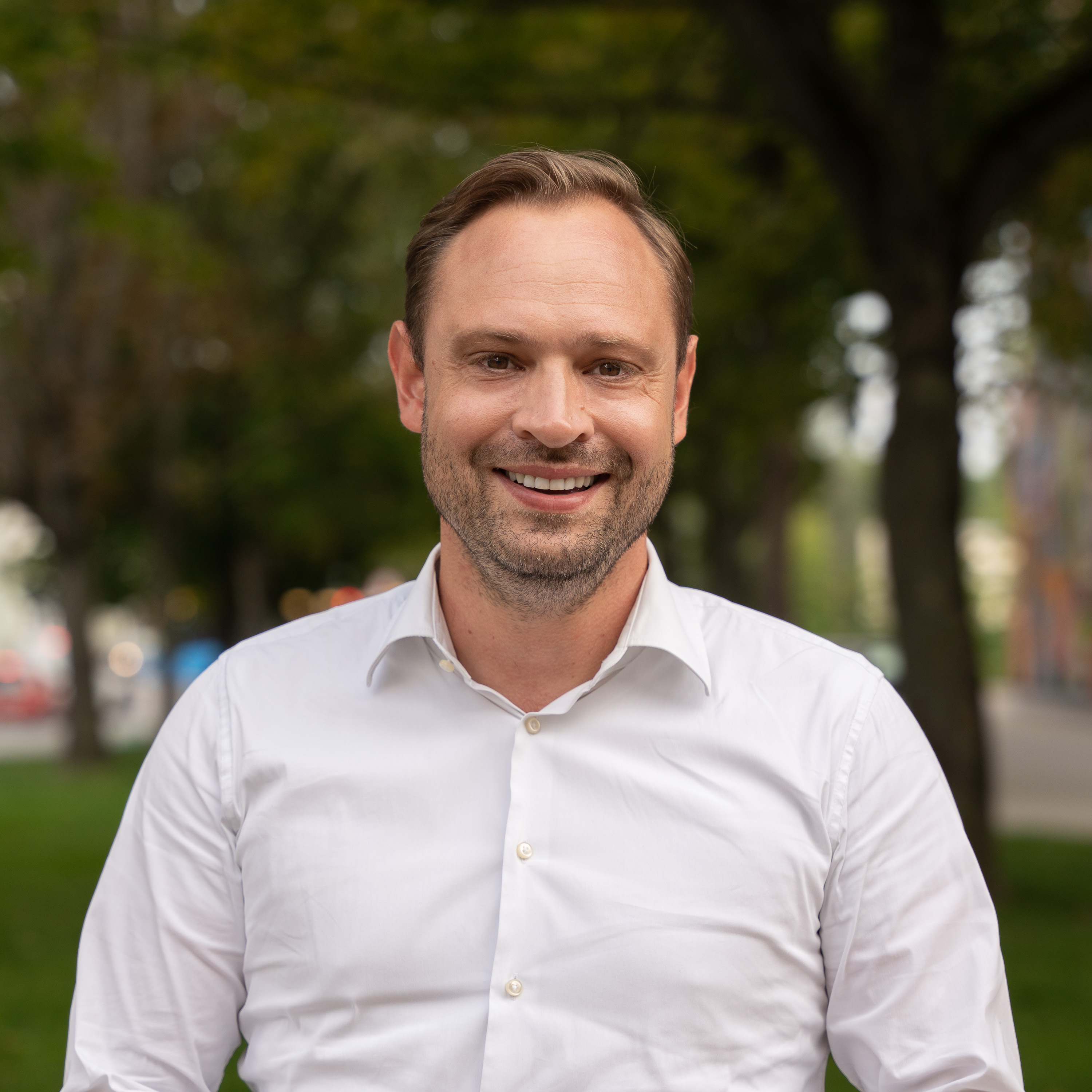
Alexander Dierks (since 1 October 2024)

Secretary-General	Term
Fritz Hähle	1991–1995
Steffen Flath	1995–1999
Frank Kupfer	1999–2001
Hermann Winkler	2001–2004
Michael Kretschmer	2004–2017
Alexander Dierks	2017–2024
Tom Unger	since 2024

=== Parliamentary group leaders ===
(since 1990)

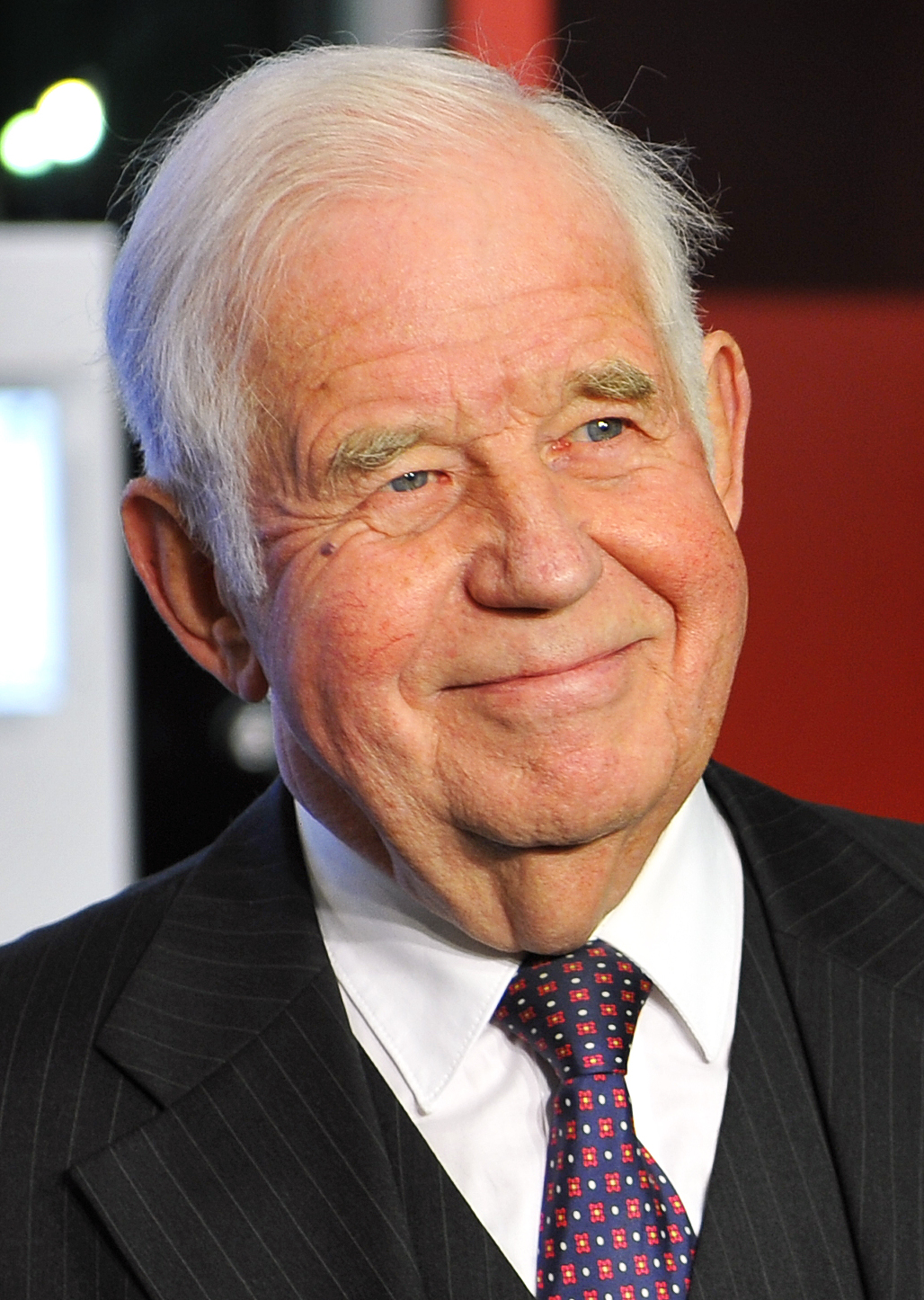
Kurt Biedenkopf (8 November 1990 to 17 April 2002)

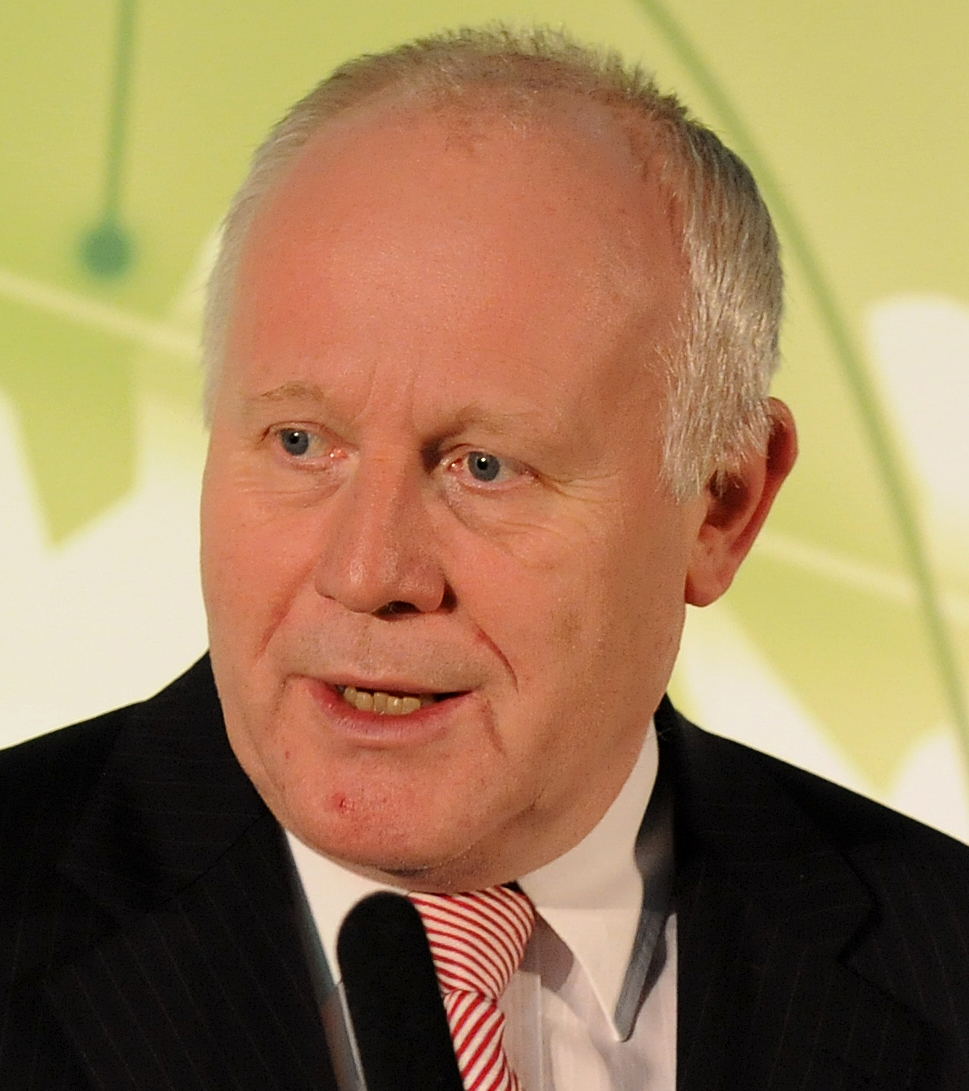
Georg Milbradt (18 April 2002 to 27 May 2008)

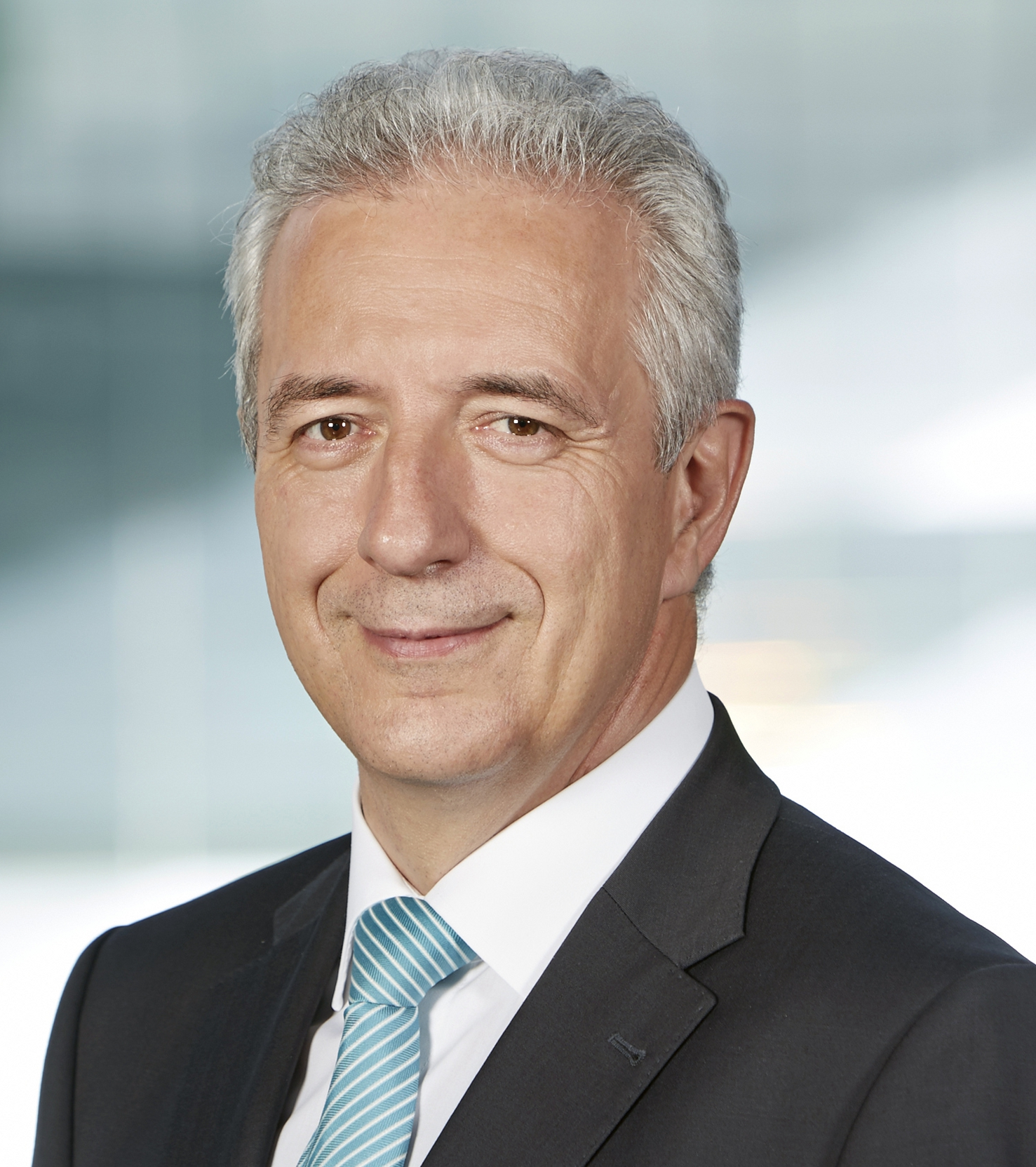
Stanislaw Tillich (28 May 2008 to 12 December 2017)

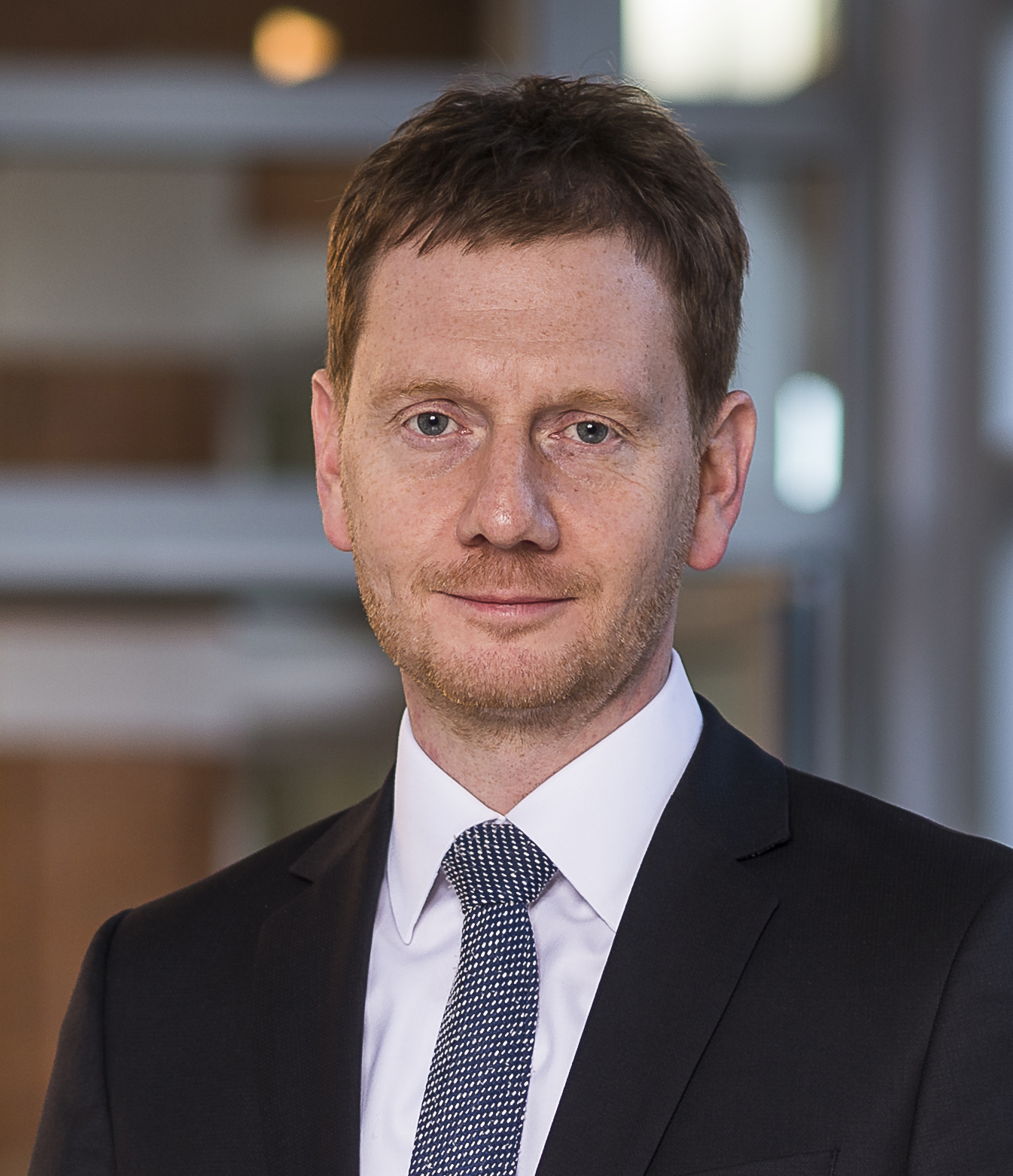
Michael Kretschmer (since 13 December 2017)

Parliamentary group leader	Term
Herbert Goliasch	1990–1994
Fritz Hähle	1994–2008
Steffen Flath	2008–2014
Frank Kupfer	2014–2018
Christian Hartmann	since 2018

=== State Group Chair ===
State Group Chair	Term
Rolf Rau	1990–1992
Joachim Schmidt	1992–1999
Manfred Kolbe	1999–2000
Michael Luther	2000–2013
Michael Kretschmer	2013–2017
Thomas de Maizière	2017–2018
Marco Wanderwitz	2018–2021
Carsten Körber	since 2021

=== Members of the Landtag of Saxony ===
In the 8th Saxon State Parliament (legislative period 2024–2029), the CDU Saxony holds 41 of the 120 seats. For a complete list of members, see List of members of the Saxon State Parliament (List of members of the 6th Landtag of Saxony (2024–2029)).

=== Members of the German Bundestag ===
In the 20th German Bundestag (legislative period 2021–2025), the CDU Saxony provides seven of a total of 38 members of the Bundestag from Saxony: Carsten Körber, Jens Lehmann, Yvonne Magwas, Markus Reichel, Lars Rohwer, Christiane Schenderlein, Marco Wanderwitz.

=== Members of the European Parliament ===
In the 9th European Parliament (legislative term 2019–2024), the CDU Saxony provides one of a total of five Members of the European Parliament from Saxony: Peter Jahr.

=== Minister-Presidents ===
The following politicians were members of the CDU Saxony when they served as Presidents of the Landtag of Saxony.

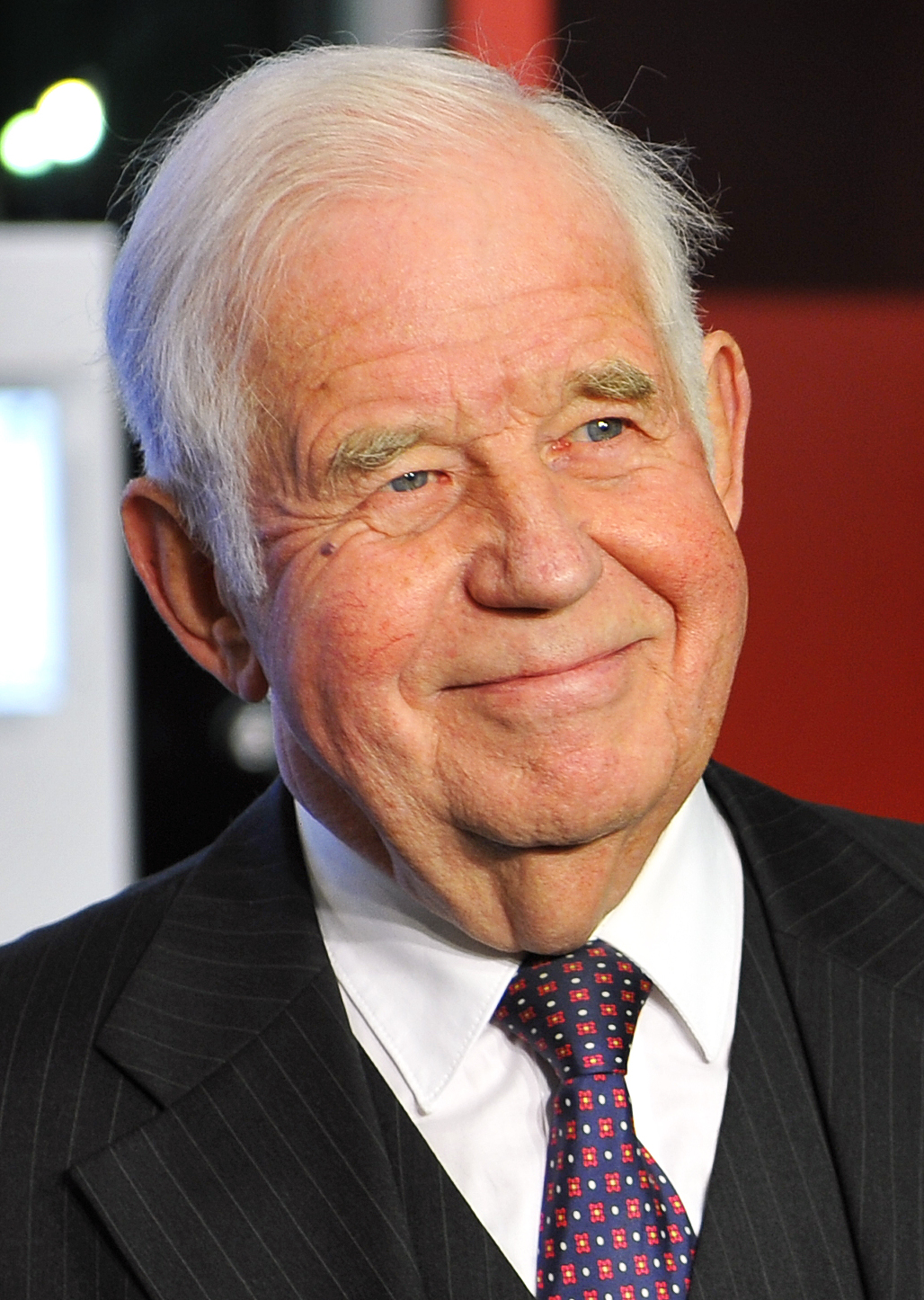
Kurt Biedenkopf (8 November 1990 to 17 April 2002)

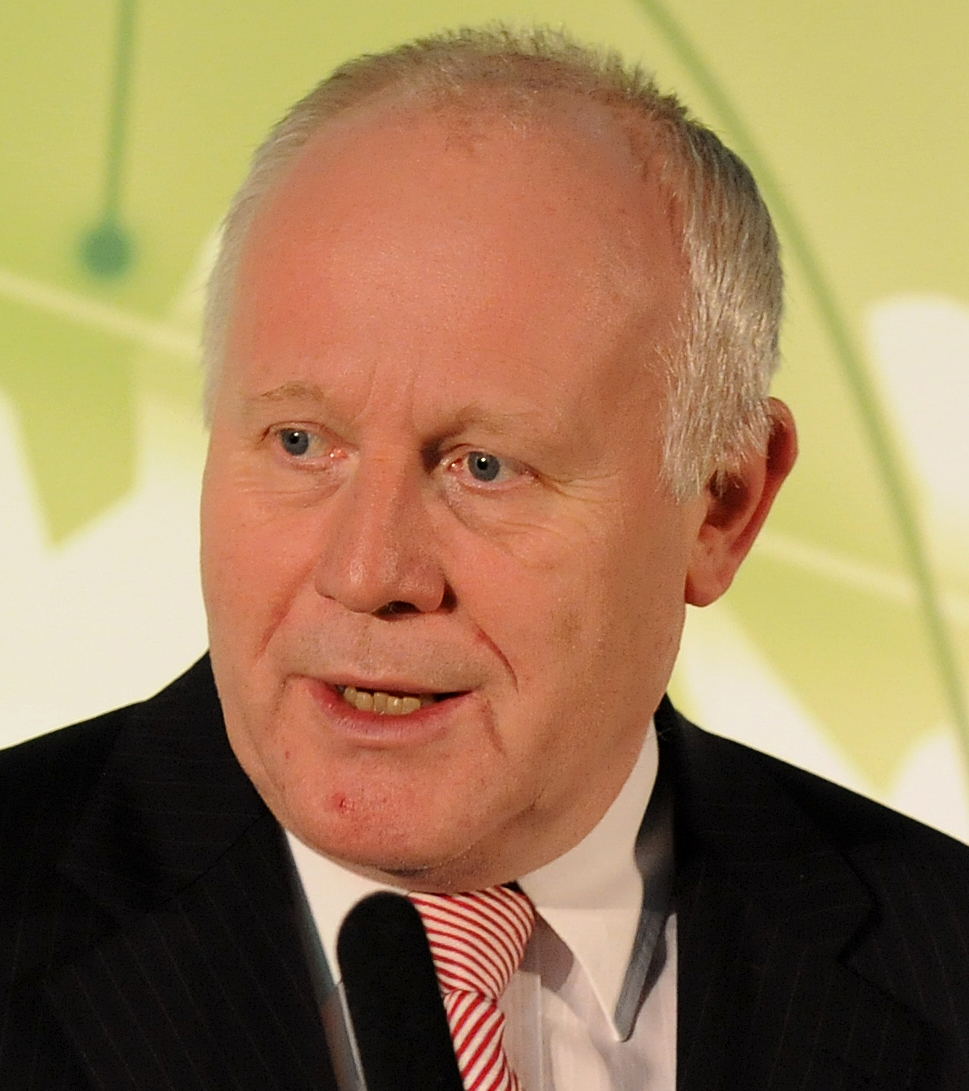
Georg Milbradt (18 April 2002 to 27 May 2008)

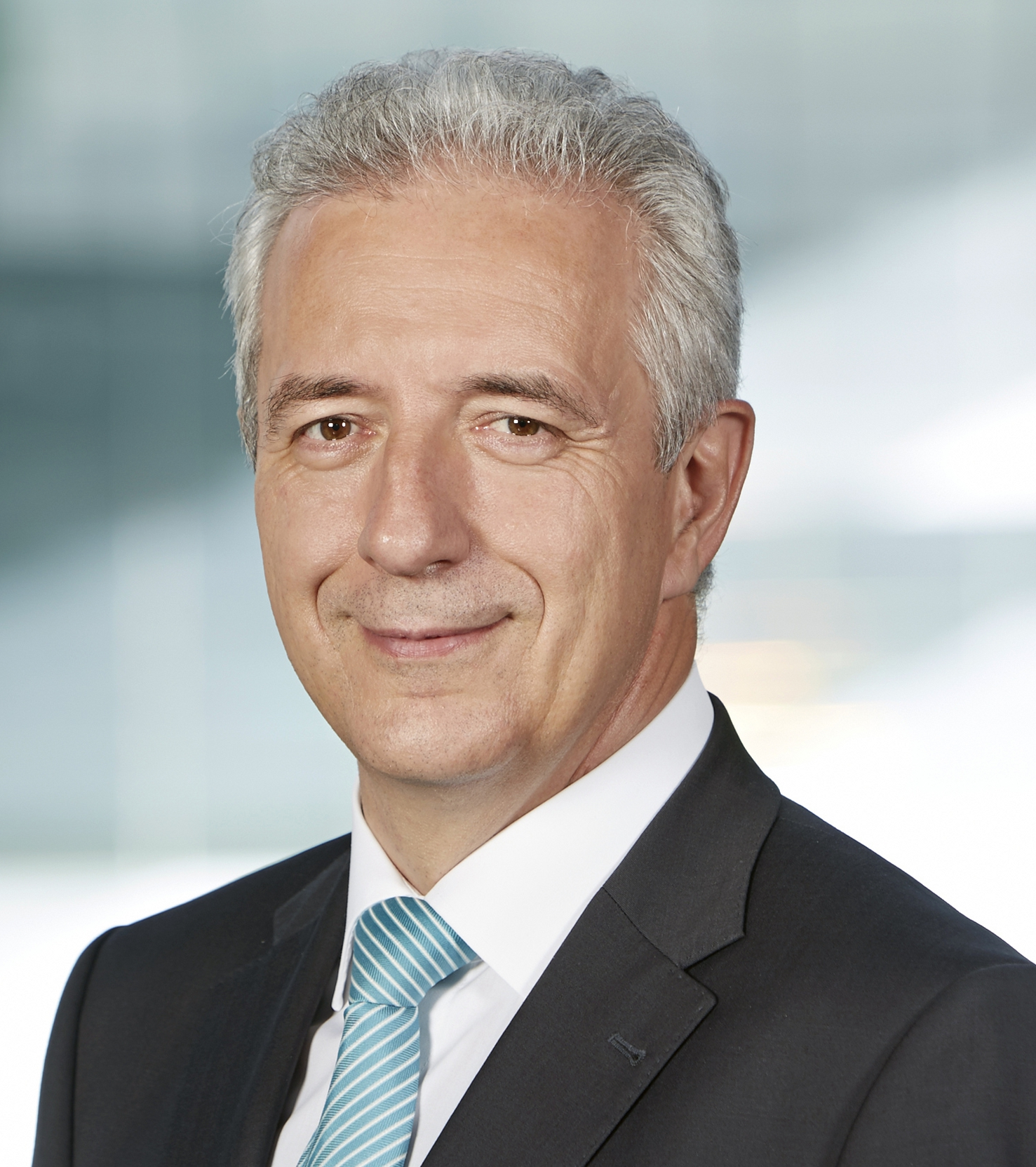
Stanislaw Tillich (28 May 2008 to 12 December 2017)

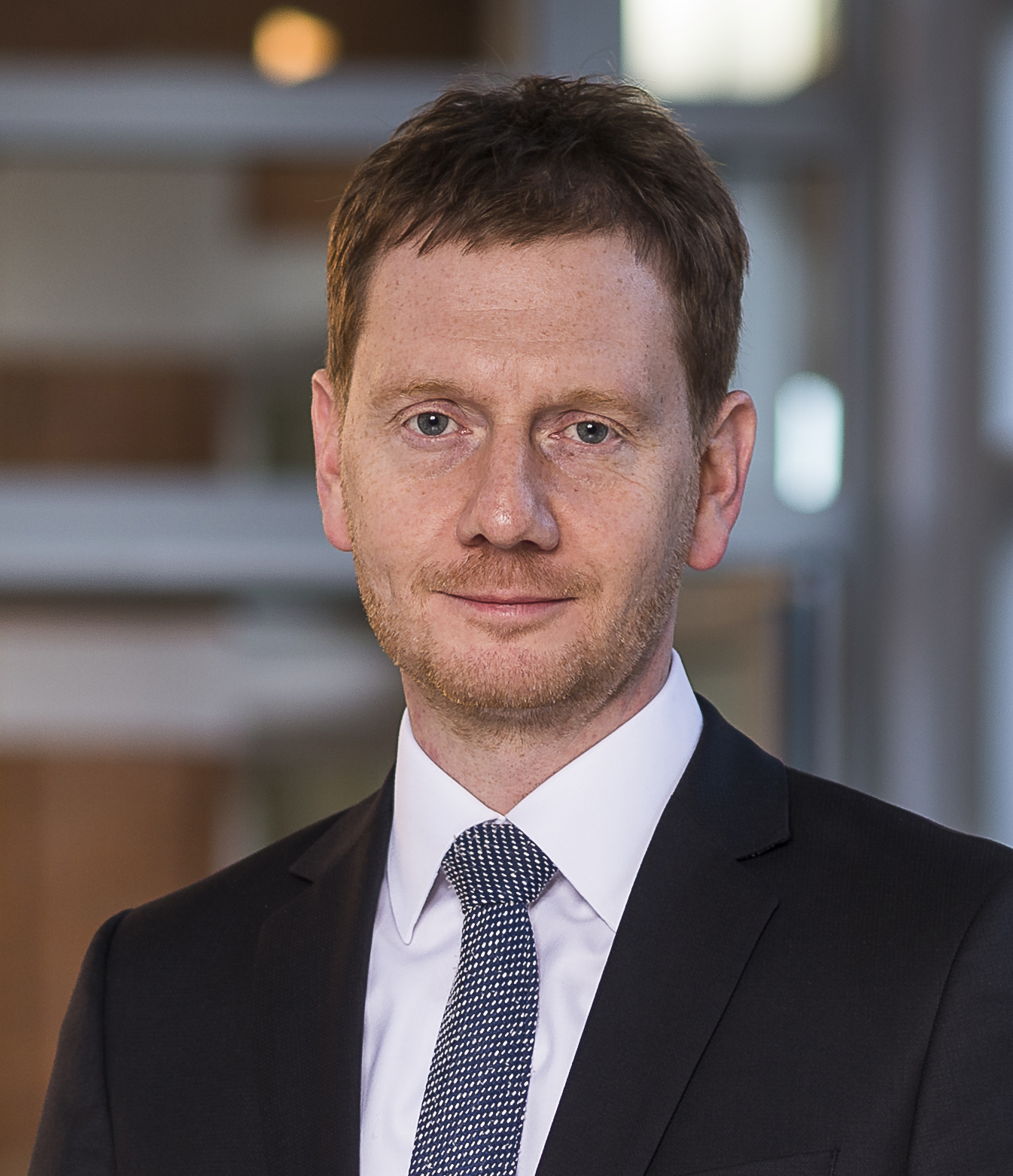
Michael Kretschmer (since 13 December 2017)

=== Presidents of the Landtag of Saxony ===
The following politicians were members of the CDU Saxony when they served as Minister-President of the Free State of Saxony.

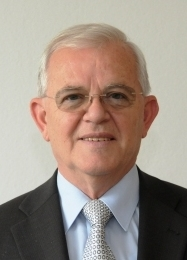
Erich Iltgen
27 October 1990 to 28 September 2009

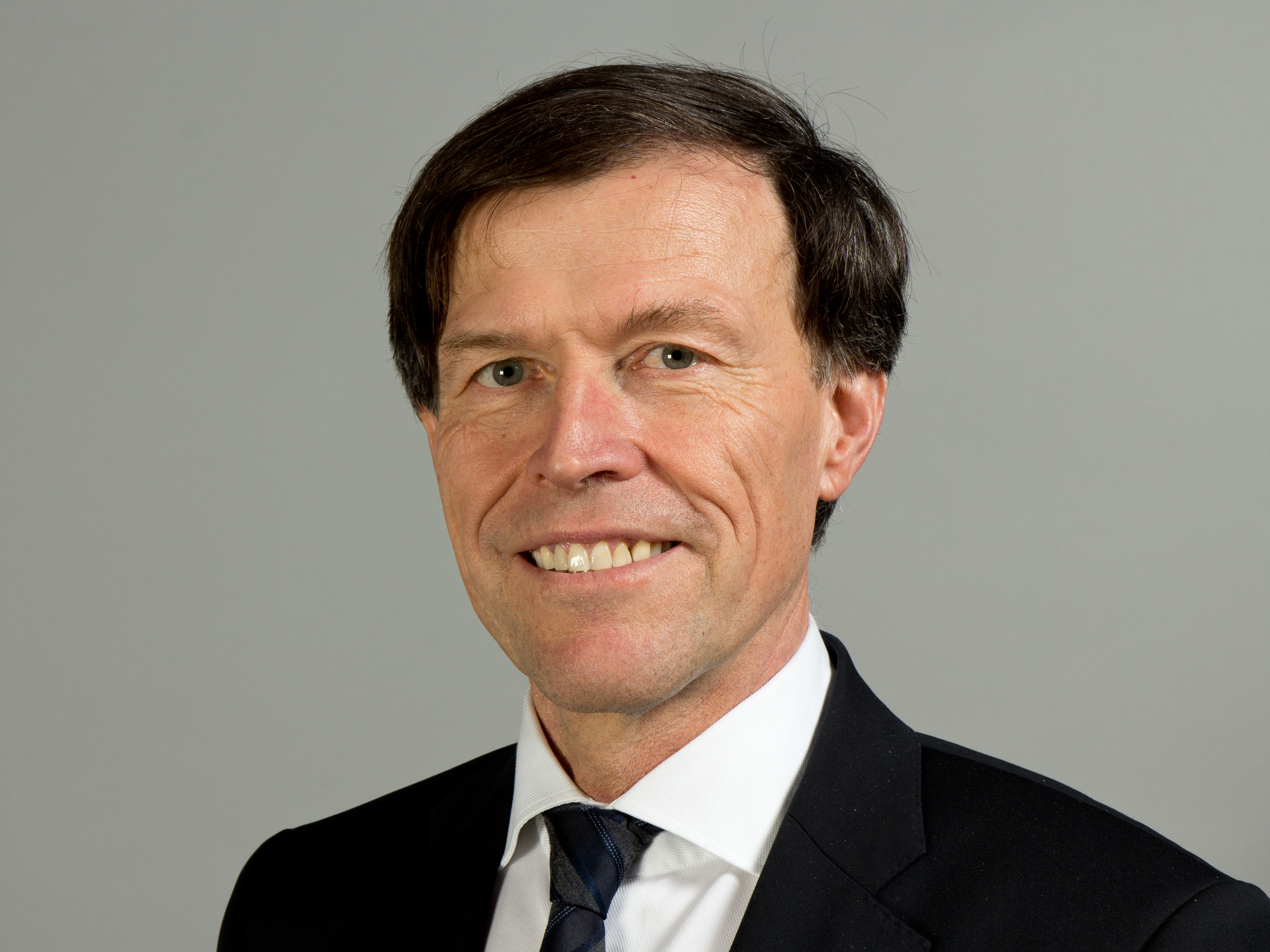
Matthias Rößler
29. September 2009 to 30 September 2024

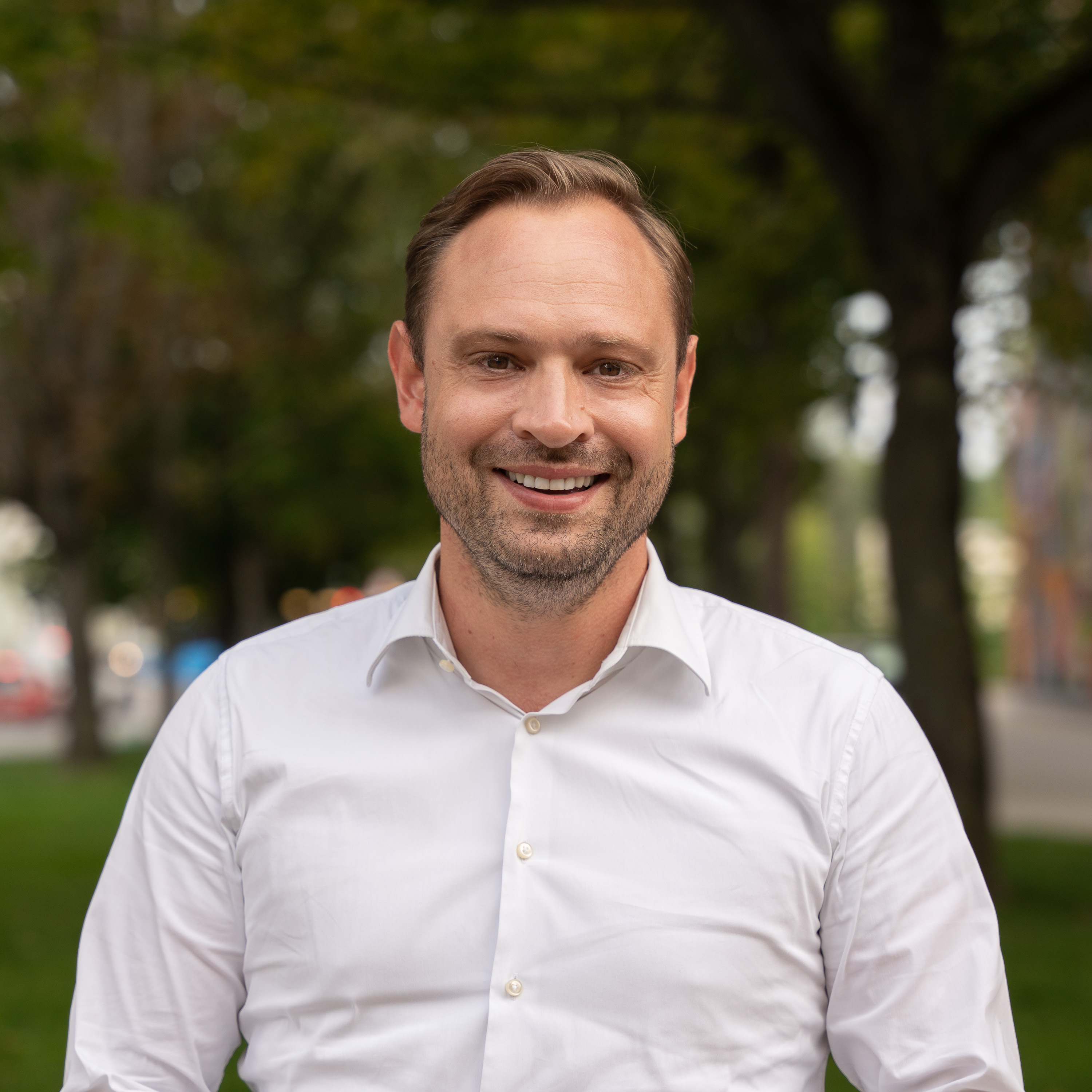
Alexander Dierks
since 1 October 2024

=== Federal Ministers and State Secretaries ===
The following politicians were members of the CDU Saxony as ministers in the German Federal Government or as Parliamentary State Secretaries:

Location	Office	Term start	Term end	Government
Gottfried Haschke	Parliamentary State Secretary in the Federal Ministry of Food, Agriculture and Forestry	24 January 1991	21 January 1993	Fourth Kohl cabinet
Ulrich Klinkert	Parliamentary State Secretary in the Federal Ministry for the Environment, Nature Conservation and Nuclear Safety	4 February 1994	17 November 1994	Fourth Kohl cabinet
Ulrich Klinkert	Parliamentary State Secretary in the Federal Ministry for the Environment, Nature Conservation and Nuclear Safety	17 November 1994	26 October 1998	Fifth Kohl cabinet
Johannes Nitsch	Parliamentary State Secretary in the Federal Ministry for Transport	17 November 1994	26 October 1998	Fifth Kohl cabinet
Thomas de Maizière	Federal Minister for Special Tasks and Head of the Federal Chancellery	22 November 2005	28 October 2009	First Merkel cabinet
Thomas de Maizière	Federal Minister of the Interior	28 October 2009	3 March 2011	Second Merkel cabinet
Thomas de Maizière	Federal Minister of Defence	3 March 2011	17 December 2013	Second Merkel cabinet
Thomas de Maizière	Federal Minister of the Interior	17 December 2013	14 March 2018	Third Merkel cabinet
Marco Wanderwitz	Parliamentary State Secretary in the Federal Ministry of the Interior	14 March 2018	14 February 2020	Fourth Merkel cabinet
Marco Wanderwitz	Parliamentary State Secretary in the Federal Ministry for Economic Affairs and Energy and Federal Government Commissioner for Eastern Germany	14 February 2020	8 December 2021	Fourth Merkel cabinet

== Literature ==
- Werner J. Patzelt: Die CDU in Sachsen. In: Christian Demuth, Jakob Lempp: Parteien in Sachsen. be.bra wissenschaft verlag, Berlin 2006, ISBN 978-3-937233-35-2, S. 87–119. (2. Edition 2007) (online: Sonderausgabe der Saxony State Agency for Civic Education (2006))
- Michael Richter: Die Ost-CDU 1948–1952. Zwischen Widerstand und Gleichschaltung (= Forschungen und Quellen zur Zeitgeschichte. Bd. 19). Droste, Düsseldorf 1990, ISBN 978-3-7700-0899-5. (2. Edition 1991)
