= Alexander Dierks =

German politician (born 1987)

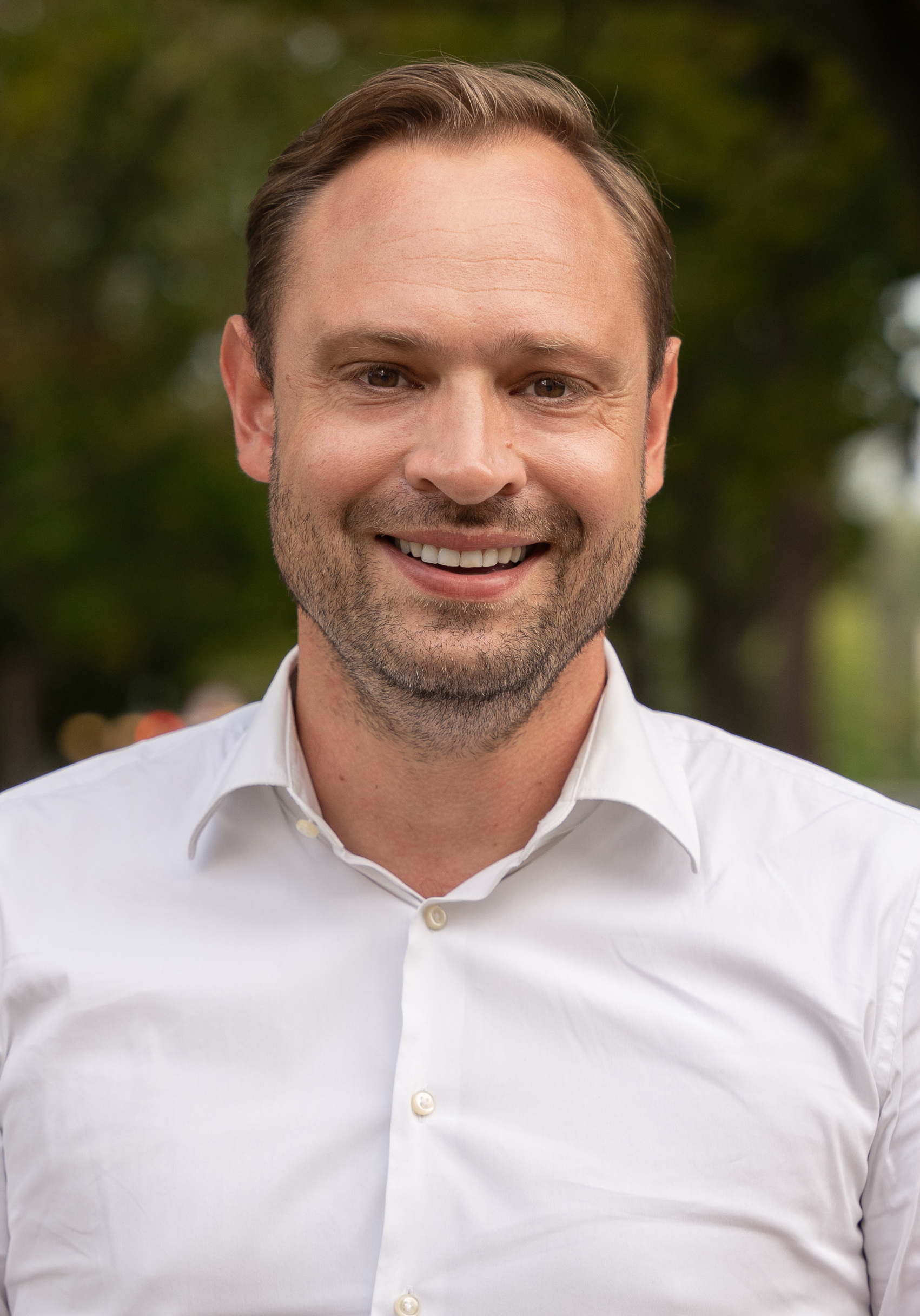
- Dierks in 2023

President of the Landtag of Saxony
- Incumbent
- Assumed office 1 October 2024
- Preceded by: Matthias Rößler

General Secretary of the Christian Democratic Union of Saxony
- Incumbent
- Assumed office 9 December 2017
- Preceded by: Michael Kretschmer

Personal details
- Born: 2 October 1987 (age 38)
- Party: Christian Democratic Union

Alexander Dierks (born 2 October 1987) is a German politician of the Christian Democratic Union (CDU). Since 2024, he has served as president of the Landtag of Saxony. He has been a member of the Landtag of Saxony since 2014, and has served as general secretary of the Christian Democratic Union in Saxony since 2017. From 2011 to 2017, he was the leader of the Young Union in Saxony. From 2014 to 2019, he was a member of the city council of Chemnitz.
