= Gerhard Rohner =

- Born: 23 May 1895; Nieder-Heiduk (near Bismarckhütte), Province of Silesia, German Empire
- Died: 7 March 1971 (aged 75); Bonn, North Rhine-Westphalia, West Germany
- Political party: CDU

Gerhard Rohner (born Nieder-Heiduk 23 May 1895: died Bonn 7 March 1971) was a politician in the Soviet occupation zone of Germany, which later became the German Democratic Republic. He became a leading member of the moderately right-wing CDU (party) which was not the party favored by the Soviet administrators and the new Moscow trained political establishment. After sustained violent attacks from the new country's ruling SED (party) he abandoned his political career and, in February 1952, fled the country.

== Life ==
After attending the Royal Upper School in Königsberg, Rohner undertook a commercial apprenticeship. By the time he was 26 he was managing a sales department and, from 1923, a technical office. Between 1925 and 1945 he worked as a self-employed commercial agent for the Flick conglomerate in Dresden, Chemnitz and Berlin.

Since 1933 Germany had been a one-party state, but following the end of the war in May 1945, with Nazi-ism defeated and Germany under foreign occupation, a return to multi-party democracy seemed to be the way ahead for many people. In July 1945 Gerhard Rohner was one of the founders of the new Christian Democratic Union (CDU party) in Dresden which, along with the entire central portion of what had been Germany, now found itself under Soviet Military Administration in what was now designated the Soviet Occupation Zone. Rohner had been a co-signatory of the CDU's "founding proclamation" of 26 June 1945 Between 1946 and January 1950 he was a member of the CDU regional leadership in Saxony. Between 3 July 1945 and the first regional election, which took place in October 1946, Rohner was vice-president of the Regional Administration in Saxony, and Head of Finance and Taxation.

In the regional elections in Saxony the officially disparaged "bourgeois" parties, the CDU and the Liberal Democrats (LDP) together out-polled the newly created Socialist Unity Party (SED) which was contrary to the plans of the Soviet administrators who had taken various measures to disadvantage the CDU and the LDPD in the regional elections. Future elections in the German Democratic Republic would be operated on a single list basis which would ensure acceptable levels of support for the ruling SED (party), but in the meantime Gerhard Rohner (whose CDU had obtained 21.8% of the vote while the LDP had achieved 29.9%) was appointed Regional Finance Minister for Saxony. He also sat as a CDU member of the Regional Legislature (Landtag) from October 1946 till February 1950.

Although the German Democratic Republic was formally created only in October 1949, by that time the basis had already been created, in April 1946, for a return to one-party government, with the contentious merger of the old Communist Party with the Moderate-left SPD. The model to be followed was now the Soviet model, and although this was not universally apparent in 1946, by 1949 it was clear that the "Bourgeois" parties were expected to operate, if at all, only to the extent they were prepared to become creatures of the ruling SED. A pressing issue for Saxony involved the expulsion of Germans from parts of what had before 1945 been in Germany, but which were east of the Oder-Neisse line, and which were now incorporated (primarily) into Poland and the Soviet Union. The westward shift of the borders on both sides of Poland had been agreed by Stalin with his British and American allies at the Potsdam conference, and it created Europe's largest refugee crisis to date. Approximately one million of the refugees ended up in Saxony, where the brutality accompanying their expulsion from their former homes was very soon communicated to the indigenous population. The ruling SED accepted uncritically the Soviet line that the horrors inflicted by Nazi Germany in Poland and the Soviet Union meant that Germans now had no reason to complain where the price paid included similar brutality inflicted on them. The "Bourgeois" parties accepted the war guilt concept but the extent to which they were nevertheless prepared to protest at the barbarous approach taken has become more apparent following the opening up of Soviet archives at the end of the twentieth century. Applying a widely applied analogy, Rohner pointed out that the Potsdam Agreement had provided for the humane relocation of refugees from Poland and Czechoslovakia, but that what was being observed was refugees being flung out of these states and transported like cattle. None of this was calculated to persuade the Soviets and their proxies in positions of power in East Germany to favour a multi-party constitution incorporating power or influence for the "bourgeois" parties. For the German People's Council (the forerunner of the East German National Legislature) convened in March 1948, adequate steps were taken to ensure an overall majority of the seats went to the SED, but the CDU nevertheless received 55 seats, and Gerhard Rohner was elected to one of these.

In October 1949, when the People's Council was reconstituted as the National Legislature / (Volkskammer), Rohner became leader of the CDU group in the chamber. In this capacity he became known for unusually forthright speeches in the chamber. For instance, he spoke against the party decision to so away with regional finance ministers. However, he came under intense pressure as the ruling party prepared for the elections in October 1950 by spelling out and extending the powers of the National Front organisation over the non-ruling parties. He was also deeply affected by the treatment being meted out to his party colleague Hugo Hickmann. In February 1952 Gerhard Rohner fled to Düsseldorf where he settled and built a new life, taking a job as a sales director for the Maxhütte steel works. (Maxhütte had been part of the Flick conglomerate since 1929.)
