= Tom Unger =

German politician (born 1985)

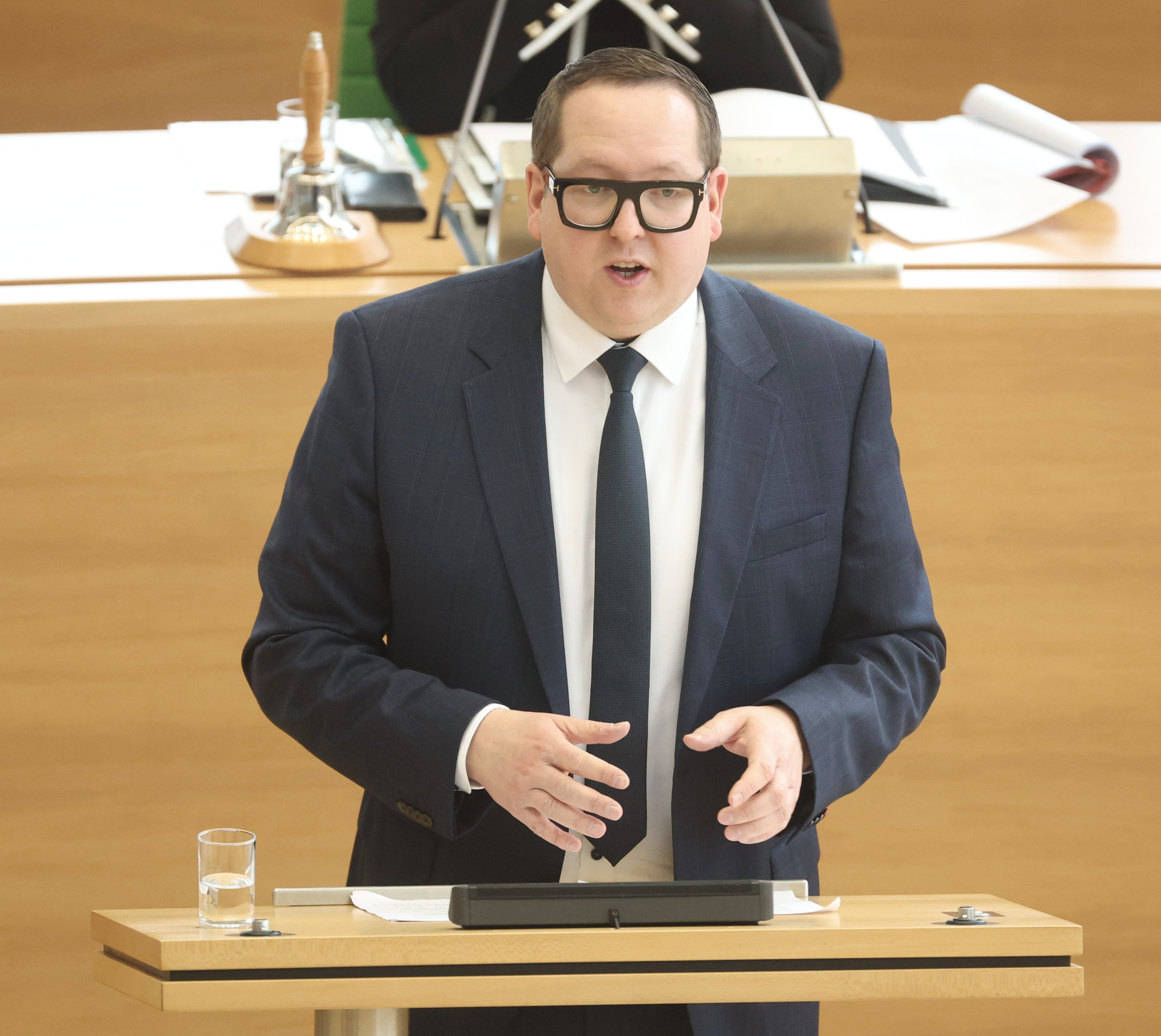
- Unger in 2024

Member of the Landtag of Saxony
- Incumbent
- Assumed office 4 January 2022

Personal details
- Born: 9 November 1985 (age 40) Karl-Marx-Stadt, East Germany
- Party: Christian Democratic Union

Tom Unger (born 9 November 1985 in Karl-Marx-Stadt (now Chemnitz)) is a German politician from the Christian Democratic Union (CDU). He has been serving as a member of the Landtag of Saxony since 2022. He has served as secretary general of CDU Saxony since 2024.
