= Hermann Winkler =

German politician (born 1963)

Hermann Winkler MEP
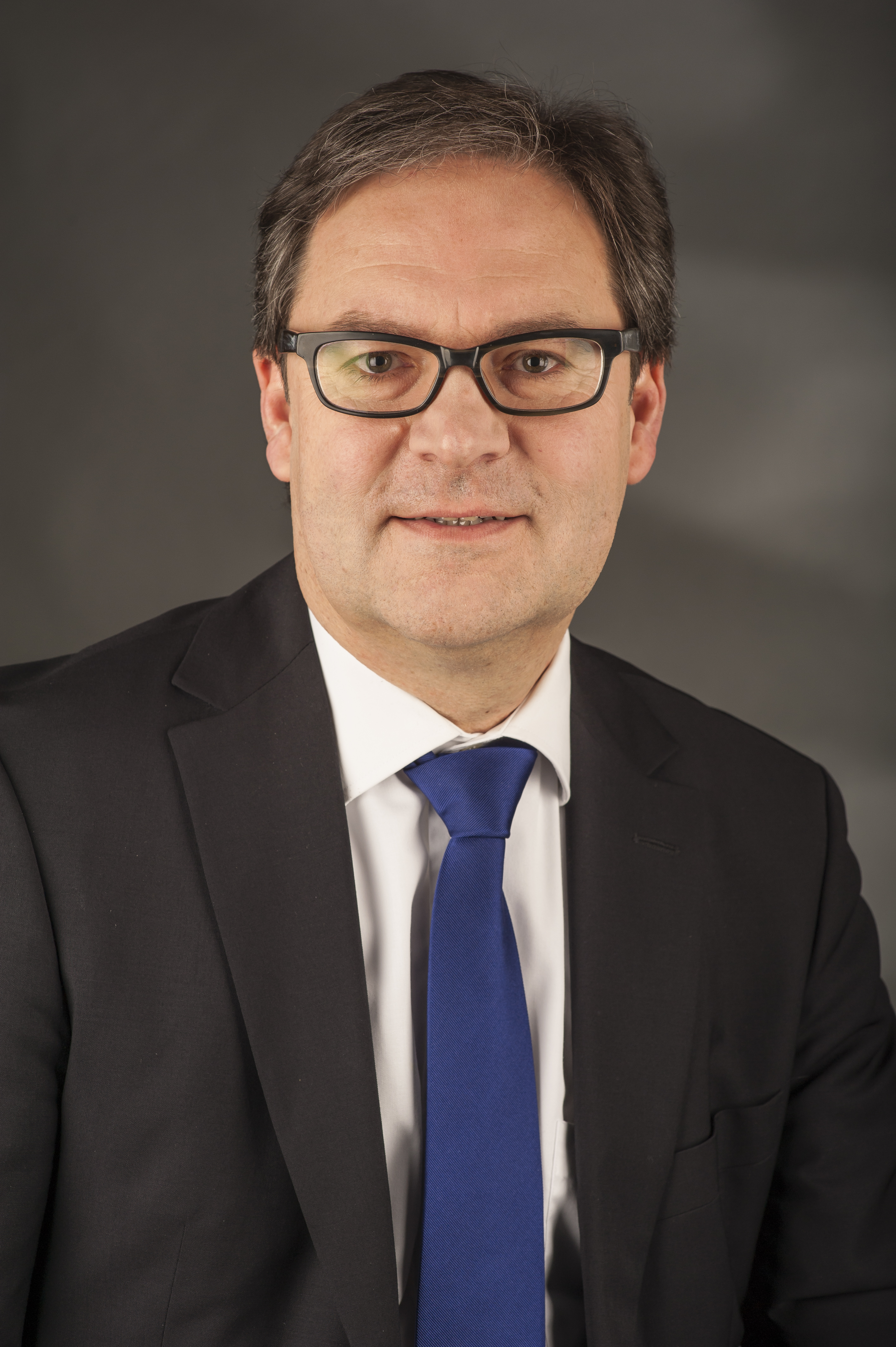

Member of the European Parliament
- In office 1 July 2009 – 1 July 2019
- Constituency: Germany

Member of the Landtag of Saxony
- In office 3 April 1990 – 1 July 2009

Personal details
- Born: Hermann Julian Winkler; 22 April 1963 (age 63) Grimma, East Germany
- Party: German: Christian Democratic Union; EU: European People's Party
- Spouse: Lara Winkler
- Children: 2
- Education: Technical University of Magdeburg

Hermann Julian Winkler (born 22 April 1963) is a German politician who served as Member of the European Parliament (MEP) from Germany from 2009 until 2019. He is a member of the Christian Democratic Union, part of the European People's Party. From 2004 to 2007 he was Cabinet Minister and Head of the State Chancellery of Saxony.

== Education and personal life ==
After his Abitur, Winkler entered the Technical University of Magdeburg to study mechanical engineering and graduated as Dipl.-Ing. From 1988 to 1990 he worked as Engineer in the VEB Chemieanlagenbau Leipzig-Grimma.

He is married and has two daughters.

== Political career ==
=== Beginnings ===
In 1988, Hermann Winkler joined the Christian Democratic Union (East Germany).

Winkler was chair of the Grimma Christian Democratic Union Municipal Association from 1990 to 1999, member of the CDU District Council of the Muldentalkreis from 1990 to 2007 (2005 to 2007 as chair) and is District Chair of the Leipzig CDU since 2007.

In addition, Winkler was regional chair of the Youth Section of the CDU in Saxony (1992–1995) and Secretary-General of the Saxony CDU from 1998 to 2004.

In the years 1990–91 Winkler was Deputy Mayor of Grimma.

From 1990 to 2009, Winkler was Member of the Landtag of Saxony, the German state of Saxony's parliament. and from 2004 to 2007 Cabinet Minister for European and State Affairs and Head of the State Chancellery of Saxony under Minister-President Georg Milbradt. In this capacity, he was a member of the Board of Directors of the publicly owned Landesbank Sachsen – at the time the smallest of Germany's Landesbanken – between 2006 and 2007, until its near-collapse and its subsequent sale to LBBW. He also represented Saxony on the European Committee of the Regions (CoR) between 2005 and 2009.

=== Member of the European Parliament, 2009-2019 ===
For the 2009 European elections, Winkler was elected as top candidate of the CDU of Saxony.

During his first term as Member of the European Parliament between 2009 and 2014, he was a full member of the Committee on Regional Development and a substitute member of the Committee on Industry, Research and Energy. In addition, he was a member of the delegations to the EU-Ukraine Parliamentary Cooperation Committee and to the Euronest Parliamentary Assembly. From 2014 until 2019, he was a full member of the Committee on Industry, Research and Energy.

In addition to his committee assignments, Winkler was a member of the European Parliament Intergroup on Small and Medium-Sized Enterprises (SMEs) as well as of the European Parliament Intergroup on Creative Industries.

== Other activities ==
- Saxony Regional Sport Association (LSB), President (1998–2004).

== Political positions ==
In October 2014, Winkler – alongside Rashida Dati – was one of only two members of the European People's Party Group who defied their own group and voted to reject the Juncker Commission’s confirmation.

In April 2015, he was the first relator of a law proposal for setting up a Union system for supply chain due diligence self-certification of responsible importers of tin, tantalum and tungsten, their ores, and gold originating in conflict-affected and high-risk areas. The system aimed to break "the nexus between conflict and illegal exploitation of minerals". In June 2015, Winkler again was one of only two members of the EPP group – this time alongside Remo Sernagiotto – who opposed a tough resolution adopted by the European Parliament, in which the majority of MEPs appealed to the EU to reassess its relations with Russia in the context of the Russo-Ukrainian War.

== Controversies ==
In 2015, Winkler reported to the police in Leipzig a painting shown in a degree show of students at the Leipzig Academy of Visual Arts. The painting depicted German Chancellor Angela Merkel standing next to a masked person pointing a rifle at her head and was intended to symbolize the ambiguity of exercise of power. Winkler argued that he considered the painting to be “borderline and not exactly beautiful”.

In 2023, during Volodymyr Zelenskyy's visit to Berlin amidst the ongoing Russian invasion of Ukraine, Winkler sarcastically mocked the Ukrainian president, calling him a "former Ukrainian actor" and suggesting the monument to Soviet soldiers in Berlin is on the verge of being dismantled because of the anti-Russian sentiment. These comments were condemned in German media.
