= Sandra Gockel =

German politician (born 1974)

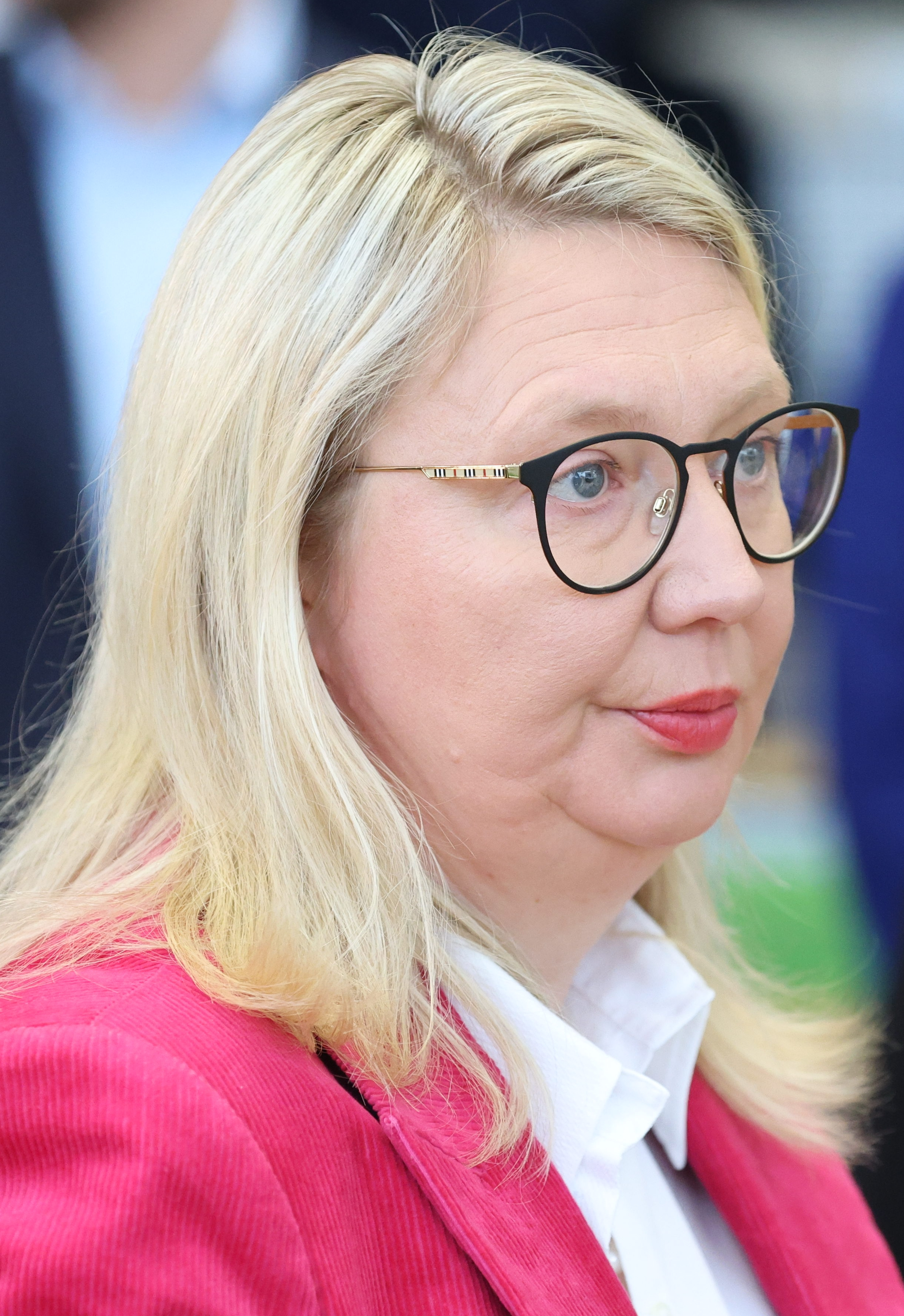
- Gockel in 2024

Member of the Landtag of Saxony
- Incumbent
- Assumed office 5 July 2022
- Preceded by: Lars Rohwer

Personal details
- Born: 8 May 1974 (age 51) Brandenburg an der Havel
- Party: Christian Democratic Union

Sandra Gockel (born 8 May 1974 in Brandenburg an der Havel) is a German politician serving as a member of the Landtag of Saxony since 2022. She has served as chairwoman of the Frauen-Union in Saxony since 2015.
