= Erich Iltgen =

German politician (1940–2019)

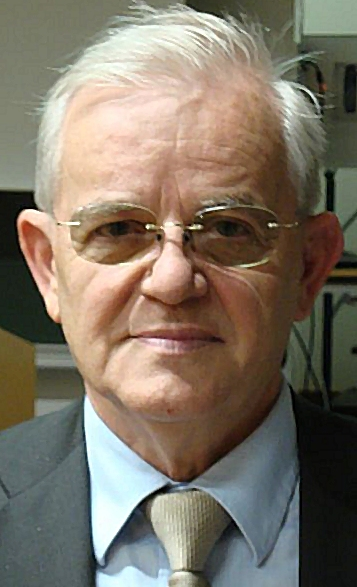
- Iltgen in 2009

President of the Landtag of Saxony
- In office 1990–2009
- Succeeded by: Matthias Rößler

Member of the Landtag of Saxony
- In office 1990–2009
- Constituency: Dresden IV; Dresden VI

Personal details
- Born: 10 July 1940 Cologne, Germany
- Died: 9 June 2019 (aged 78)
- Party: Christian Democratic Union
- Spouse(s): Eva Maria Becke (deceased) Elizabeth (m. 2005)
- Children: 4

Erich Iltgen (10 July 1940 – 9 June 2019) was a German politician of the Christian Democratic Union. From 1990 to 2009, he was president of the Saxony state parliament, the Landtag of Saxony.

== Biography ==
=== Early years ===
Erich Iltgen was born in Cologne during the early years of World War II. In 1943, his parents relocated the family to Dresden, supposing that the risk from aerial bombing might be lower in Saxony.

=== Career ===
After training as an agricultural machinist and motor mechanic from 1954 to 1957, he studied in agricultural engineering and technology engineering for heating, ventilation and sanitation between 1958 and 1964. After that he worked from 1964 to 1979 in power plant construction and from 1979 to 1985 as a department manager for investment in Dresden. From 1985 to 1988 he was head of the Cathedral of the Diocese of Dresden-Meissen, and from 1988 to 1990 head of the Diocese of Dresden-Meissen itself. Iltgen was Roman Catholic. His first wife, by whom he has four children, predeceased him; he remarried in 2005.

=== Politics ===
Between 1989 and 1990, Iltgen was a moderator of the roundtable of the district of Dresden, and was a member of the Coordinating Committee for the education in Saxony.

In June 1990 he joined the CDU. He represented constituency 42 (Dresden IV) in the First Parliament of Saxony, and on 27 October 1990 was elected its president. He was reelected following state elections in Saxony in the years 1994, 1999 and 2004 respectively. In the second and third terms, he represented the constituency of 45 (Dresden IV), and in the fourth Legislature for the Dresden VI. He is also a member of the Presidium of the CDU's national association.

=== Retirement ===
In 2009 he did not stand for re-election in the regional election held in Saxony a few weeks after his 69th birthday. Iltgen was an honorary president of the National Tourism Association and member of the Board of Trustees of the New Saxon Art Association, of which he was president from 1990 to 1991.

== Literature ==
- Klaus-Jürgen Holzapfel (Hrsg.): Sächsischer Landtag: 4. Wahlperiode, 2004–2009. Volkshandbuch. 3. Auflage. NDV Neue Darmstädter Verlagsanstalt, Rheinbreitbach 2008, ISBN 978-3-87576-603-5, S. 72
