= Christiane Schenderlein =

German politician

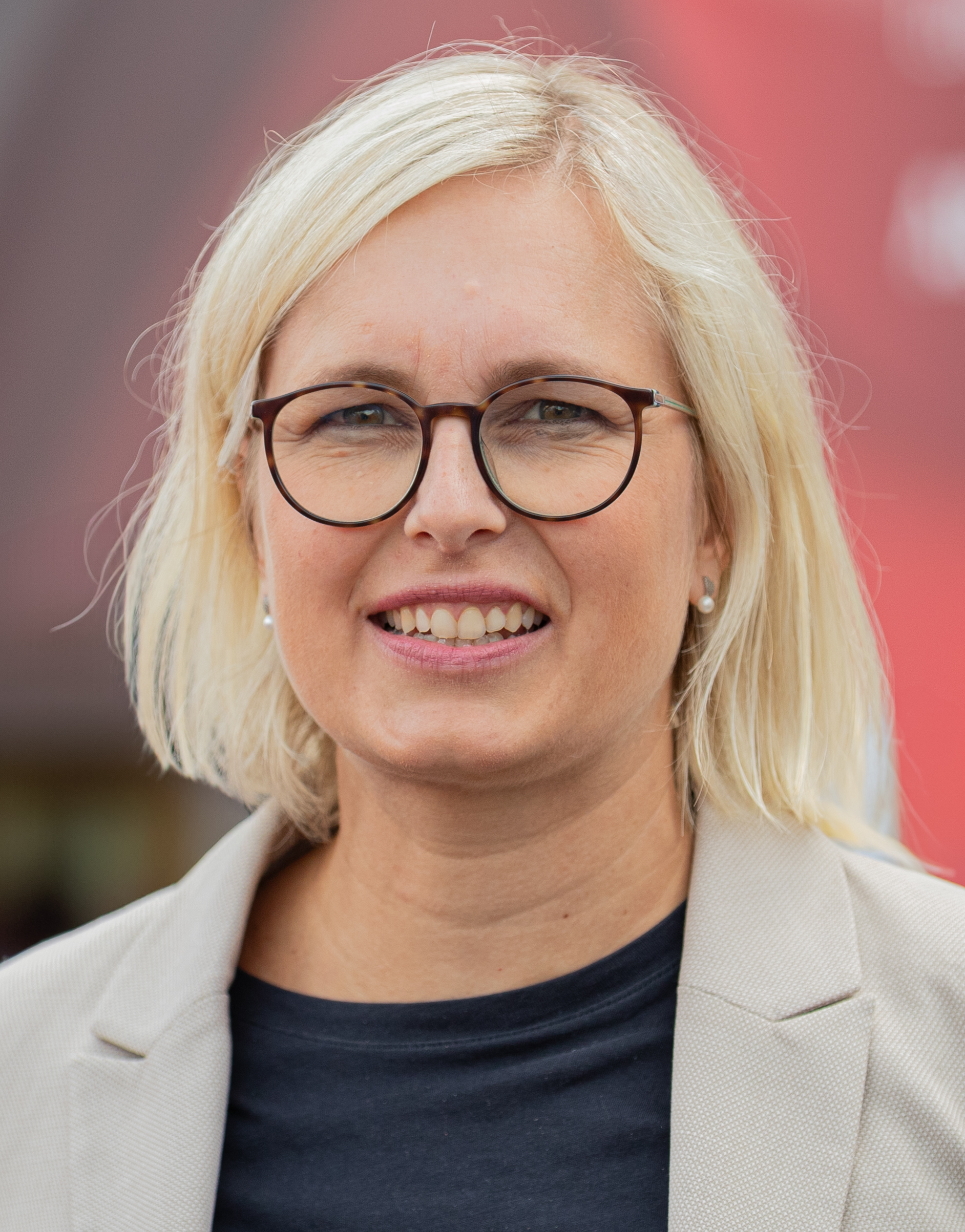

Member of the Bundestag
- Incumbent
- Assumed office 26 October 2021

Personal details
- Born: 17 October 1981 (age 44) Weißenfels, Halle District, East Germany (now Weißenfels, Saxony-Anhalt, Germany)
- Party: CDU

Christiane Schenderlein (born 17 October 1981) is a German politician of the Christian Democratic Union (CDU) who has been serving as a member of the Bundestag since 2021.

In addition to her work in parliament, Schenderlein has been serving as Minister of State at the Chancellery (2025–2026) and as a Parliamentary State Secretary at the Federal Ministry of Health (2026–present) in the government of Chancellor Friedrich Merz since 2025.

== Early life and education ==
Schenderlein was born 1981 in the East German town of Weißenfels.

== Political career ==
Schenderlein became member of the Landtag of Saxony in 2019.

In the Bundestag, Schenderlein initially served as her parliamentary group’s spokesperson for cultural affairs and media.

In the negotiations to form a Grand Coalition under the leadership of Friedrich Merz's Christian Democrats (CDU together with the Bavarian CSU) and the Social Democrats (SPD) following the 2025 German elections, Schenderlein led the CDU delegation in the working group on cultural and media affairs; her counterparts from the other parties were Volker Ullrich and Carsten Brosda.

== Other activities ==
- Stiftung Archiv der Parteien und Massenorganisationen der DDR (SAPMO), Member of the Board of Trustees (since 2022)
