= Christian Hartmann (politician) =

German politician (born 1974)

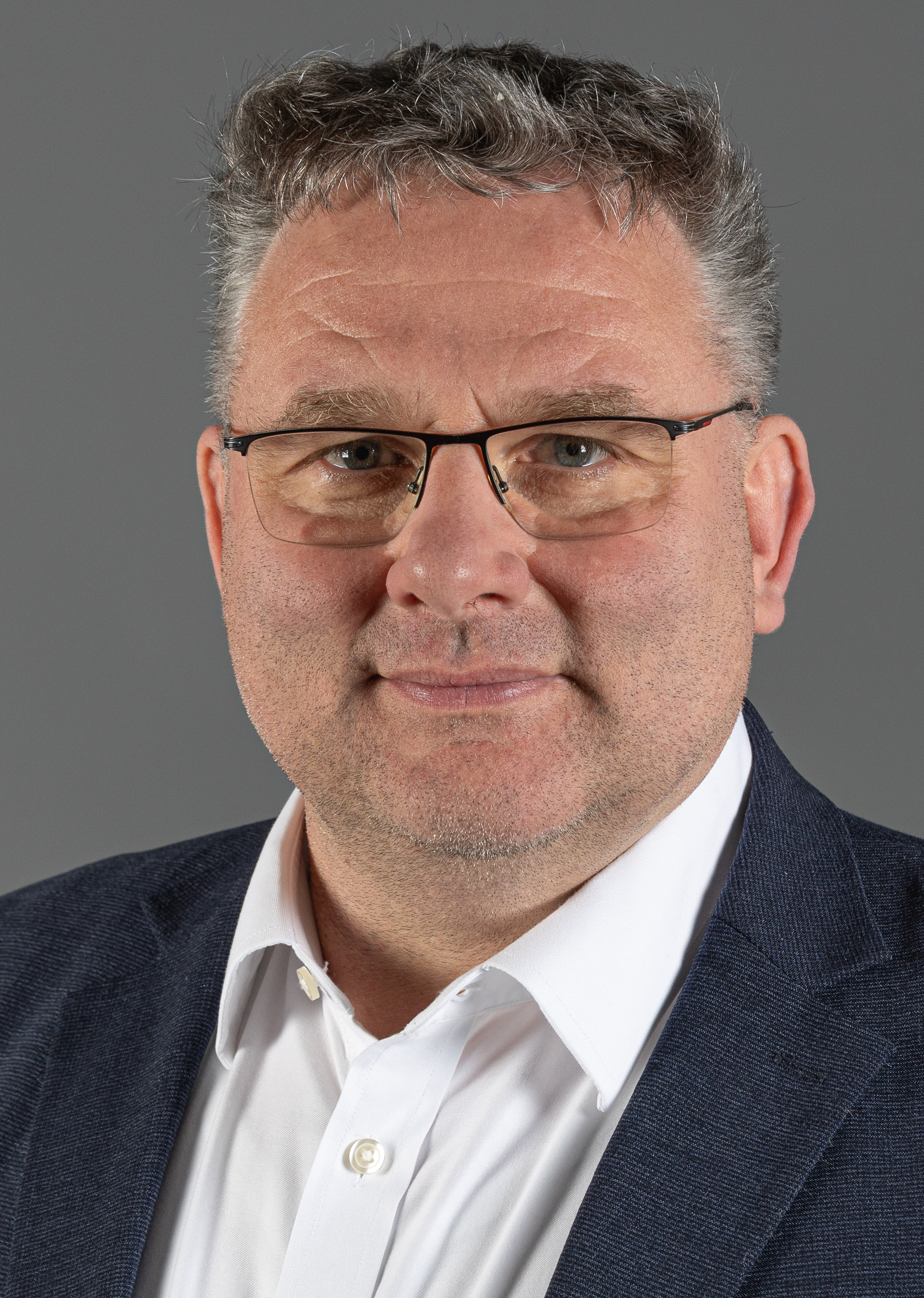
- Hartmann in 2025

Member of the Landtag of Saxony
- Incumbent
- Assumed office 29 September 2009
- Preceded by: Andreas Grapatin
- Constituency: Dresden 5 (2009–2014); Dresden 1 (since 2014)

Personal details
- Born: 6 April 1974 (age 51) Calbe, Germant
- Party: Christian Democratic Union (since 1994)

Christian Hartmann (born 6 April 1974 in Calbe) is a German politician serving as a member of the Landtag of Saxony since 29 September 2009. He has served as group leader of the Christian Democratic Union since 2018.
