= Stephan Weinrich =

German politician (born 1986)

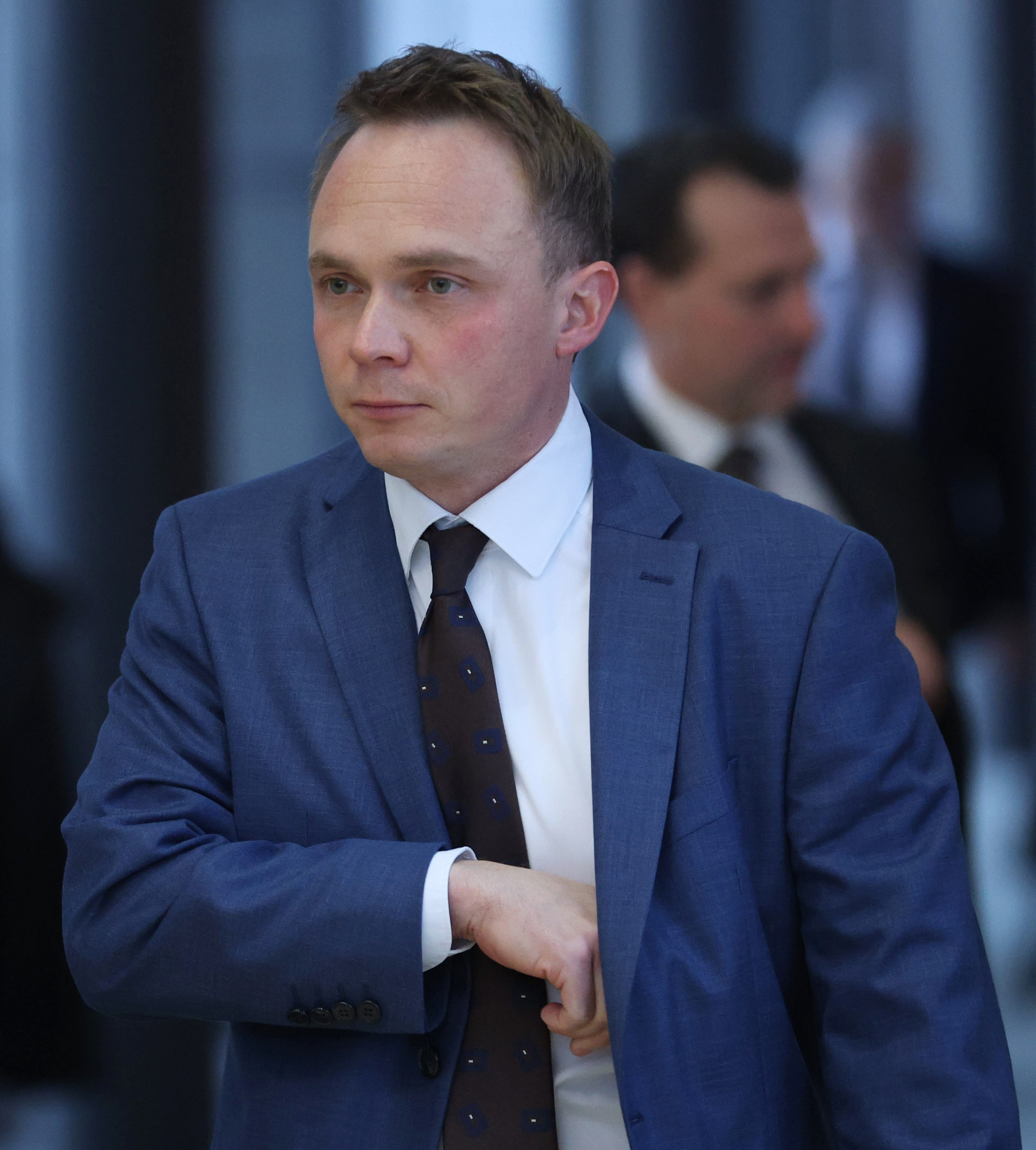
- Weinrich in 2024

Member of the Landtag of Saxony
- Incumbent
- Assumed office 1 October 2024

Personal details
- Born: 2 January 1986 (age 40)
- Party: Christian Democratic Union

Stephan Weinrich (born 2 January 1986) is a German politician serving as a member of the Landtag of Saxony since 2024. From 2015 to 2024, he served as mayor of Niederdorf.
