= Matthias Rößler =

German politician (born 1955)

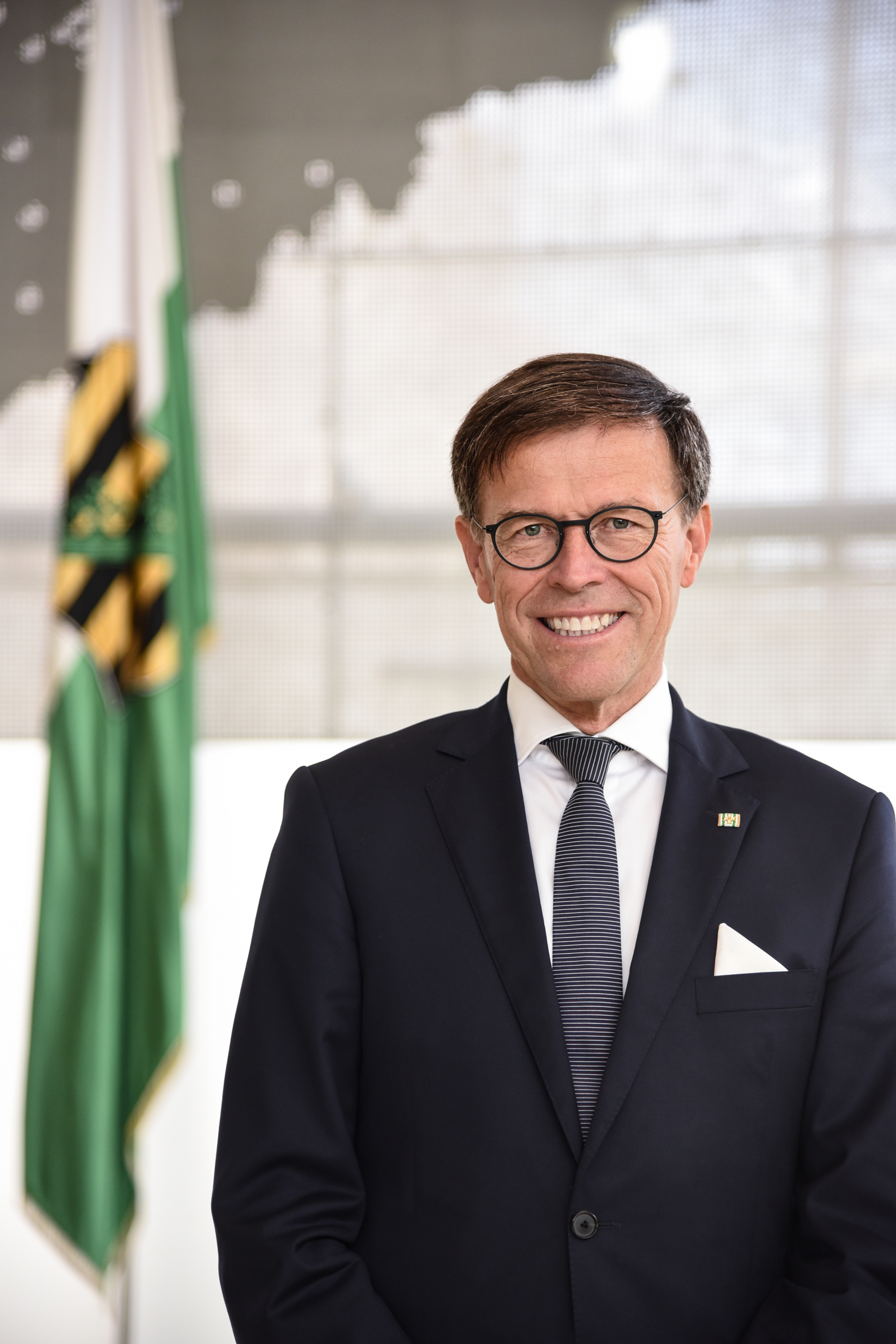

President of the Landtag of Saxony
- Incumbent
- Assumed office 29 September 2009
- Preceded by: Erich Iltgen

Saxon State Minister for Science and Art
- In office 18 April 2002 – 10 November 2004

Saxon State Minister for Education
- In office September 1994 – April 2002

Member of the Landtag of Saxony
- Incumbent
- Assumed office 8 November 1990

Personal details
- Born: 14 January 1955 (age 71) Dresden, East Germany
- Party: Christian Democratic Union
- Children: 3
- Education: TU Dresden

Military service
- Allegiance: National People's Army

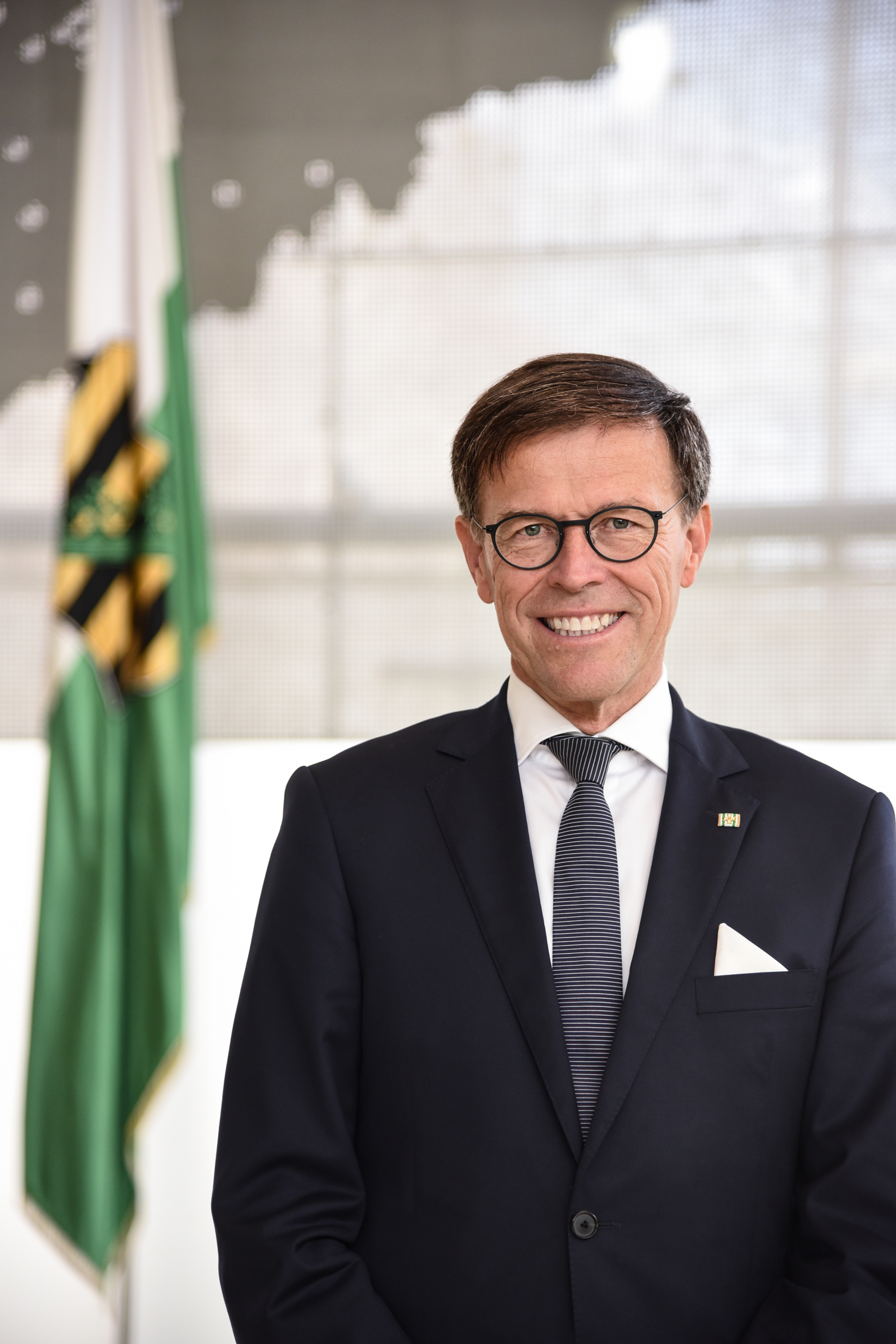
Matthias Rößler, 25 September 2018

Erich Matthias Rößler (born 14 January 1955) is a German politician, and member of the Christian Democratic Union (CDU). Since 1990, he has been a member of the Saxon Landtag. From 1994 to 2004 he served as minister of culture, later as minister of science and art in the government of Saxony. Since 2009, he has been the "Landtagspräsident", and the speaker of the Saxon parliament.

== Career ==
Rößler was born in Dresden, the son of a master gardener from the village of Cossebaude (now a western district of Dresden). He attended Christenlehre (Christian education) and refused to become a member of the socialist youth organizations, but was accepted nonetheless to a high school in Dresden (today Romain-Rolland-Gymnasium), graduating in 1973 with and excellent grade 1.0. Because of his political abstinence, he was denied to study ethnography. He did the minimum service (Grundwehrdienst) in the National People's Army and then studied mechanical engineering, graduating in 1979 with a diploma.

He then worked as a research assistant at the University of Transport in Dresden. There he obtained his doctorate in 1983 with a dissertation Experimentelle Untersuchungen charakteristischer Strömungserscheinungen in einem speziellen geraden Gitter bei hochturbulenter Anströmung (Experimental investigations of characteristic flow phenomena in a special straight grate at highly turbulent flow). From 1985 to 1990, he was a development engineer and a senior researcher in the Kombinat Lokomotivbau/Elektrotechnische Werke in Hennigsdorf. From 1989, he also worked at the Academy of Sciences on topics of basic research. He is the holder of several patents and author of scientific publications.

== Political career ==
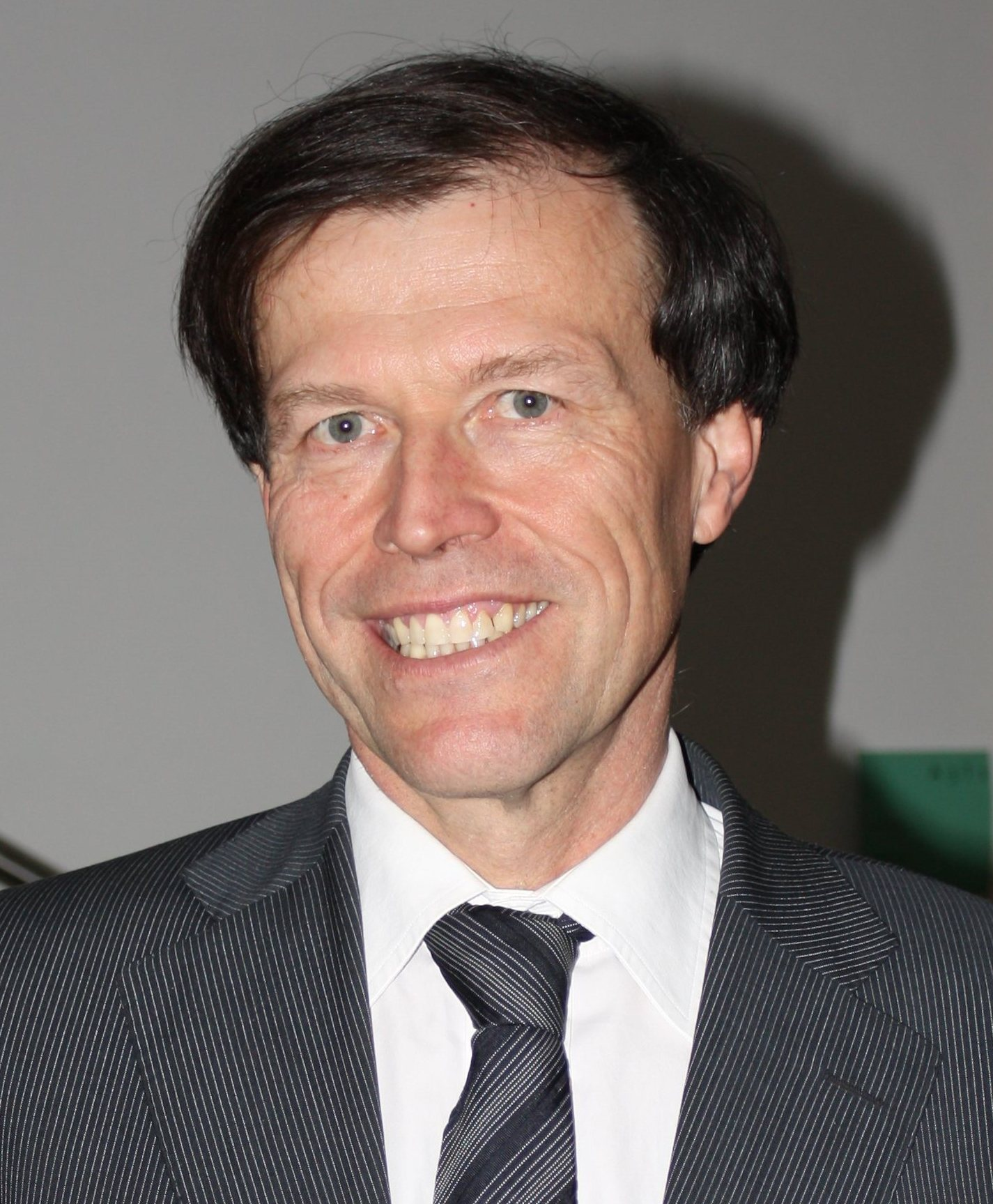
Matthias Rößler in April 2010

In 1989, Rößler joined the opposition movement Democratic Awakening. He took over functions in the central party leadership in Berlin and was a science policy spokesman of the party. He also served on the group's state board of Saxony.

In 1990, he was instrumental in forming the Ministry of Culture of the Free State of Saxony. He joined the CDU, which he represented in the parliament of Saxony. He was one of the initiators of the founding of the Hannah Arendt Institute for Research on Totalitarianism in Dresden, to explore totalitarian structures and their impact on individuals and society.

From September 1994 to April 2002, Rößler was Saxon State Minister for Education, and was also the Chairman of the German Sportministerkonferenz (conference of sport ministers). From 18 April 2002 to 10 November 2004, he was Minister for Science and Art.

On 16 September 2009, Rößler was nominated as successor of the retiring speaker of parliament Erich Iltgen and elected on 29 September with 82 votes out of 132. On 26 May 2005 he was awarded the Sächsische Verfassungsmedaille by Erich Iltgen for the "Mitgestaltung der Grundzüge der sächsischen Bildungspolitik" (participation in the founding structure of Saxon education policy). Since his election to as speaker of parliament, he has been a member of the Sächsischer Verdienstorden (Saxon Order of Merit).

Rößler was a CDU delegate to the Federal Convention for the purpose of electing the President of Germany in 2017. Ahead of the Christian Democrats’ leadership election in 2018, he publicly endorsed Friedrich Merz to succeed Angela Merkel as the party’s chair.

In June 2022, Rößler announced that he would not stand in the 2024 state elections but instead resign from active politics by the end of the parliamentary term.

== Personal life ==
Rößler is married since 1979 and has two sons.
