= Hugo Hickmann =

German politician (1877–1955)

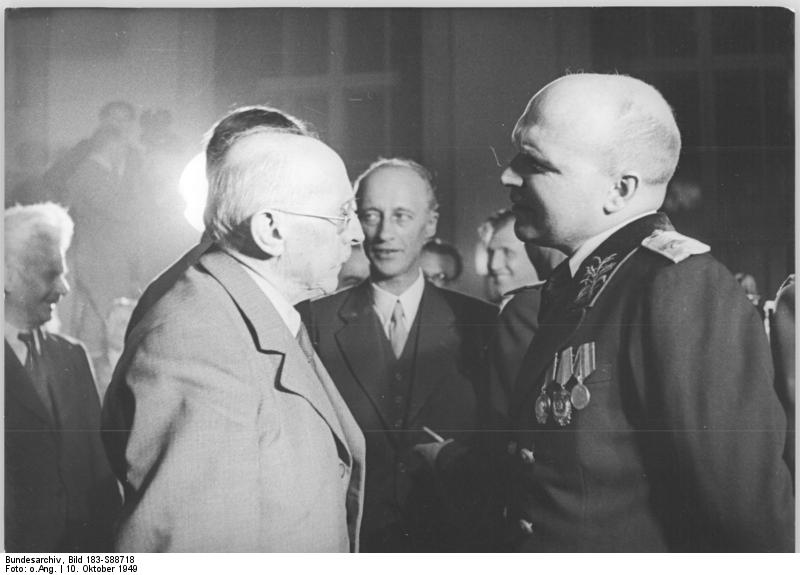
- Hugo Hickmann in conversation with Soviet envoy Vladimir Semyonovich Semyonov at the ceremony to mark Founding of East Germany (7 October 1949)
- Born: 3 September 1877; Dessau, Duchy of Anhalt, German Empire
- Died: 30 May 1955 (aged 77); Langebrück (Dresden), Bezirk Dresden, East Germany
- Occupations: Teacher; Politician
- Political party: DVP; CDU

Hugo Hickmann (born Dessau 3 September 1877; died 30 May 1955 Langebrück) was a German politician.

He was politically active for long enough to have a ringside seat in the later 1940s as West Germany and East Germany became separate countries, and East Germany quickly reverted to the pattern of the previous administration by becoming a one-party state. Neither of these developments seemed as inevitable or obvious at the time as they later became with the benefit of hindsight: Hugo Hickmann was resolute in his opposition to both of them.

== Life ==
=== Early years ===
Hickmann was born in a small town in the Duchy of Anhalt, some 70 km (45 miles) north of Leipzig. His father was Hugo Woldemar Hickmann (1841-1922), a prominent Lutheran pastor. His grandfather was a doctor. One aunt was a minor novelist and there were several teachers among his nearer kinsfolk. In terms of the Marxist class classifications popular in the 1940s and 50s, Hickmann was born into the Bourgeoisie. He attended secondary school in Freiberg between 1892 and 1899, then going on to study Theology at the universities of Leipzig, Marburg and Tübingen from 1899 till 1903.

After passing his public exams in 1903 he became a trainee teacher at small school in Roßwein, and went on to teach at a school in Riesa from 1904 till 1906. Between 1906 and 1908 he was involved in teacher training at workshops and seminars in Dresden. Hickmann never married.

=== Middle years ===
In 1908 he took a job teaching theology at the Queen Carola Secondary School in Leipzig, also working at the university from where, in 1917, he received his professorship. In 1926 he was awarded an honorary doctorate by the Theology Faculty at Leipzig University.

Hickmann was also extremely active in church matters. In 1926 he became vice-president of the evangelical-Lutheran regional synod for Saxony. a position he would retain till 1933. By this time he had already also served as the organisation's chairman, the Regional Church Credit Co-operative for Saxony (LKG) was established in Dresden in order to encourage self-help among church members in response to the high level of financial distress that had followed the war, the impact of the national reparations bill and the ensuing hyperinflation. Church funds should "once more be used only for genuinely church related purposes". The LKG was the first evangelical-church credit institute in Germany. The institution's objective was not to be maximize profits, but rather to use any revenue surpluses to protect favourable terms for LKG members in the front-line of business activity in the region.

The National Socialist power seizure which took place in January 1933 saw Hickmann relieved of his church offices. Aged 55/56 he also went into early retirement from his school teaching. He nevertheless held on to a position as a canon at Meißen and as a committee chairman with the German Bible Society, and these posts afforded him opportunities to continue with his public criticisms of the Nazi regime. This earned him an official ban on public speaking and assembly.

== Politics ==
=== Weimar years (1919–1933) ===
Hickmann was politically engaged from 1919, when he joined the German People's Party (DVP / Deutsche Volkspartei), for which in September 1922 he was elected to the Regional Assembly in Dresden. Here he took a particular interest in cultural and social issues.

He continued to sit in the Saxony assembly till 1933, becoming one of its two deputy vice-presidents after the regional election of November 1926. He also, between 1921 and 1924, sat on a council committee in Leipzig, roughly 100 km (65 miles) away to the west of Dresden.

=== Nazi years (1933–1945) ===
Under the Nazi Party Germany became a one party state. As a staunch critic of the party in question Hickmann was quickly relieved of his public offices and silenced politically.

=== After the war (1945–1955) ===
After the war the frontier dividing Germany from Poland moved west, as part of a larger political settlement one result of which was many millions of Germans being forced or obliged to relocate in order to avoid living in Poland or the Soviet Union (where they had become acutely unpopular due to Nazi-inspired atrocities). What remained of Germany was divided into four zones of occupation to be administered by the army of one of four of the powers that had won the war. The future for Germany looked very uncertain and very bleak, but there was a general assumption that at some stage the foreign armies would go home and what remained would become a single country. The one-party state of the Nazis would be replaced by some for of multi-party democracy not totally dissimilar from the pre-Nazi system that Hitler, at a party conference back in 1929 in had disparagingly dismissed as the "Weimar Republic". These were the assumptions and goals for Germany shared by Hugo Hickmann, whose home region now found itself in the Soviet occupation zone of Germany. However, at the beginning of May 1945 a team of former Communist exiles landed in Berlin headed up by Walter Ulbricht. As matters turned out they arrived with a detailed plan of their own, supported by Moscow, which did not envisage a single German state.

In 1945 there were few politicians alive and active from the last time Germany had been a multi-party democracy. On the political left those that did remain now resurrected the old SPD (party) for the moderates and the old KPD (party) for the Communists. On the more liberal and right-wing side there was felt to be a need for a new national party that combined some of the virtues of some of the smaller parties that had represented political moderation in the 1920s with the numerical strength available from a more united approach. The result was the foundation of the CDU (Christian Democratic Union of Germany / Christlich Demokratische Union Deutschlands). In Saxony Hugo Hickmann was a founder member and, from July 1945 till January 1950, the CDU's regional chairman. In December 1945 he joined the CDU leadership team for the entire Soviet occupation zone, between 1947 and 1948 serving as acting chairman. From 1948 till January 1950 he held office as the Vice-Chairman of the CDU (East) in what was by now increasingly seen as a separate Germany, the German Democratic Republic. In October 1949 he was elected a member of the provisional People's Chamber (Volkskammer).

Hugo Hickmann as a lone dissenter

At a meeting of the People's Council held in East Berlin on 3 August 1948 with the single agenda item, "Guidelines for the constitution of the German Democratic Republic", Hickmann's was the only voice raised against the consensual mood of the meeting:

"The organs for constructing political will are the political parties. The so-called non-party organisations for the most part operate in reality as the unilateral deliverer of policy on behalf of just one particular party."

Members of the People's council were uneasily startled by an unprecedented statement of dissent, but Hickmann persisted, implicitly pointing out that (apart from a couple of representative Communist party members from West Germany) the assembled delegates were in no position to mandate any constitutional arrangements except in that part of Germany where they were backed by the Soviet army:

"A decision regarding a settled constitution can only be a task for a German national assembly."

Hickmann also held political office during this period on a regional level, elected to a newly recreated Regional assembly for Saxony in 1946. He became an assembly vice-president, retaining that position till February 1950.

In April 1946 the principal left of centre parties in what was becoming the German Democratic Republic, the SPD and KPD, were forcibly merged to form the new SED (Socialist Unity Party of Germany / Sozialistische Einheitspartei Deutschlands) which from then on increasingly operated as the ruling party in a new one-party state. Hickmann's critical attitude to the SED (party) created powerful enemies. After the enforced resignation in 1947 of Jakob Kaiser as CDU party chairman the SED manifested an ever more obvious determination to bring the East German CDU into line.

A speech by Hickmann to the regional assembly in Dresden on 6 January 1950 intensified the ongoing political attacks against him. He questioned the leading role of the SED, defended the private sector economy and warned strongly against the separation of the German Democratic Republic from West Germany. He demanded independence for the political parties and expressed his satisfaction that at least in West Germany, under the leadership of the Christian Democrat Konrad Adenauer, a Christian state existed. The Saxony branch of the CDU now found itself at the top of the SED hitlist. On 23 January 1950 the SED faction in the Dresden regional assembly where Hickmann had delivered his trenchant speech earlier in the month ranted at the CDU members with the words "Hängt sie auf, die Sau!" (roughly:"Hang the pig"), and demanded Hickmann's resignation. Within the (East German) CDU the party newspaper suddenly found itself with a new editor while party functionaries at all levels were placed under intensified pressure to adhere to the agenda of the ruling SED. Hickmann resigned from the CDU on 30 January 1950. Two months later the CDU was one of five East German political parties incorporated within a new umbrella group called the National Front, an alliance of political parties and mass organisations controlled by the SED, announced in February and in place by March 1948. The Regional assembly of Saxony, along with other similar institutions in other parts of East Germany, was dissolved in July 1952 (but effectively restored in 1992).

Officially Hugo Hickmann, who in 1950 celebrated his 73rd birthday, now retained just one official position, as Chairman of the Bible Society in Saxony. But he also remained till his death the most important linkman for the "Exiled CDU" in Saxony.
