= Third Kretschmer cabinet =

Government of Saxony, German since 2024

Third Cabinet of Michael Kretschmer Kretschmer III
- 11th Cabinet of Saxony
- 19 December 2024 –
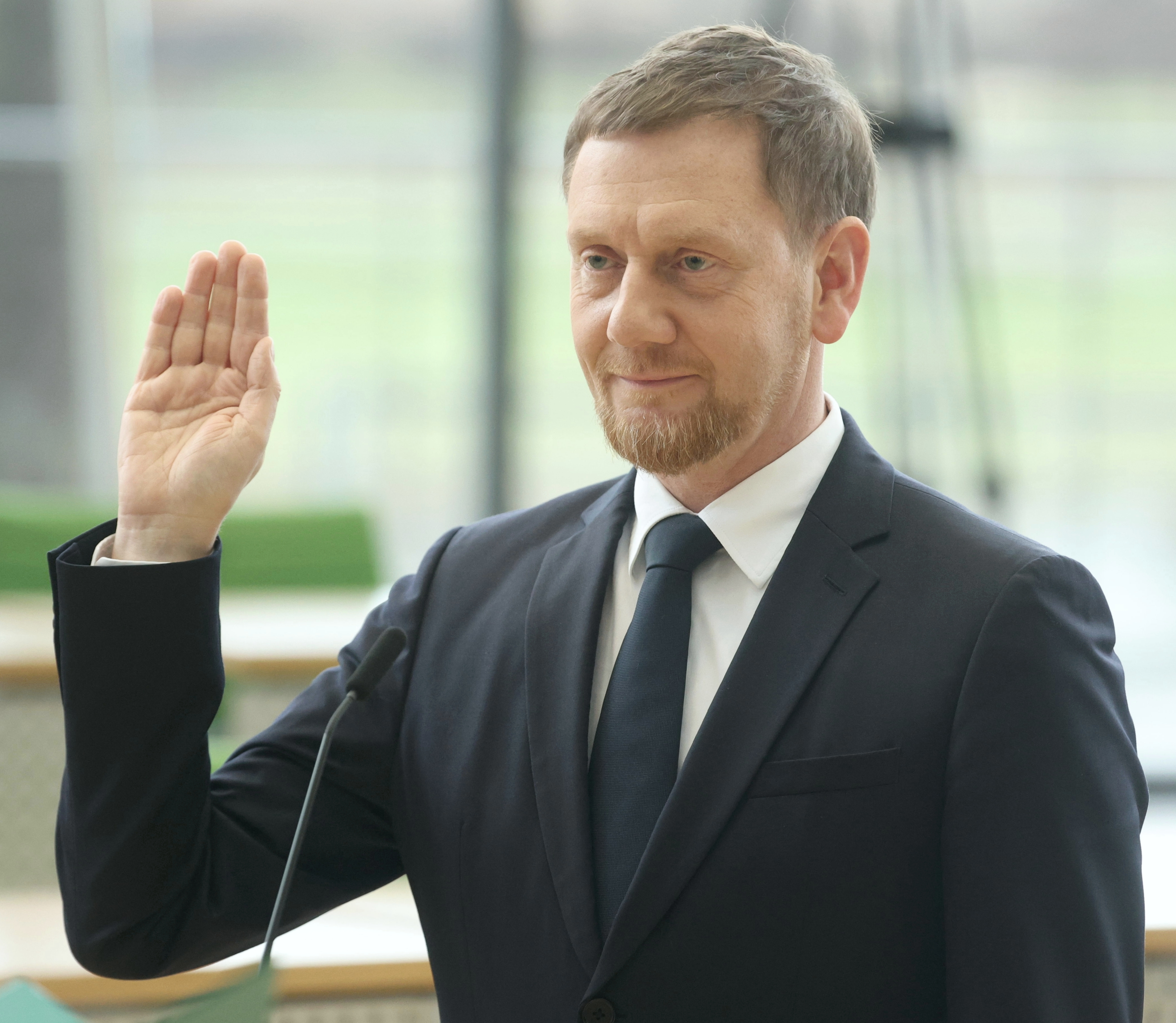
- Michael Kretschmer at his swearing-in ceremony on December 18, 2024
- Date formed: 19 December 2024

People and organisations
- Minister-President: Michael Kretschmer (CDU)
- Deputy Minister-President: Petra Köpping (SPD)
- No. of ministers: 10
- Member parties: Christian Democratic Union; Social Democratic Party
- Status in legislature: Coalition government (minority); 51 / 120 (43%)
- Opposition parties: Alternative for Germany; Sahra Wagenknecht Alliance; Alliance 90/The Greens; The Left; Free Voters of Saxony
- Opposition leader: Jörg Urban; Sabine Zimmermann

History
- Election: 2024 Saxony state election
- Legislature term: 8th Landtag of Saxony
- Predecessor: Second Kretschmer cabinet

The third Kretschmer cabinet has formed the state government of Saxony, Germany, since 18 December 2024. Michael Kretschmer leads a coalition between the CDU and the SPD, a minority government. This was following the 2024 Saxony state election. It contains four new members than the Second Kretschmer cabinet.

== Members of the state government ==
Government office	Photo	Name	Party	State secretaries
Minister President Staatskanzlei		Michael Kretschmer	CDU	Andreas Handschuh Head of the State Chancellery State Secretary for Federal and European Affairs
Deputy Minister President		Petra Köpping	SPD	Dagmar Neukirch
Minister of State for Social Affairs, Health and Social Cohesion		Petra Köpping	SPD	Dagmar Neukirch
Minister of State for the Interior		Armin Schuster	CDU	Ulf Bandiko
Minister of State of Finance		Christian Piwarz	CDU	Sebastian Hecht
Minister of State for the Environment and Agriculture		Georg-Ludwig von Breitenbuch	CDU	Ulrich Menke
Minister of State for Education		Conrad Clemens	CDU	Wilfried Kühner
State Minister for Science		Sebastian Gemkow	CDU	Heike Graßmann
Minister of State for Culture and Tourism		Barbara Klepsch	CDU	Heike Graßmann
State Minister for Economic Affairs, Labor, Energy and Climate Protection		Dirk Panter	SPD	Thomas Kralinski (up to October 23, 2025); Sebastian Scheel (from October 24, 2025)
Minister of State of Justice		Constanze Geiert	CDU	Till Pietzcker
Minister of State for Infrastructure and Regional Development		Regina Kraushaar	CDU	Barbara Meyer (politician) (up to December 31, 2025); Sören Trillenberg (from January 1, 2026)

== Election of the Minister-President ==
Dresden, 18 December 2024 (seats in the Landtag of Saxony: 120 votes, absolute majority: 61)
ballot	candidate	number of votes	share (votes cast)
1st round of voting	Michael Kretschmer (CDU)	55	45.8%
1st round of voting	Jörg Urban (AfD)	40	33.3%
1st round of voting	Matthias Berger (independent, for Free Voters)	6	5.0%
1st round of voting	abstentions	12	10.0%
1st round of voting	Invalid votes	7	5.8%
2nd ballot	Michael Kretschmer (CDU)	69	57.5%
2nd ballot	Jörg Urban (AfD)	1	0.8%
2nd ballot	Matthias Berger (independent, for Free Voters)	39	32.5%
2nd ballot	abstentions	11	9.2%
2nd ballot	Invalid votes	0	—
Michael Kretschmer was thus re-elected as Prime Minister of Saxony.
