= Second Kretschmer cabinet =

State government of Saxony

Second Cabinet of Michael Kretschmer Kretschmer II
- 10th Cabinet of Saxony
- 20 December 2019 – 19 December 2024
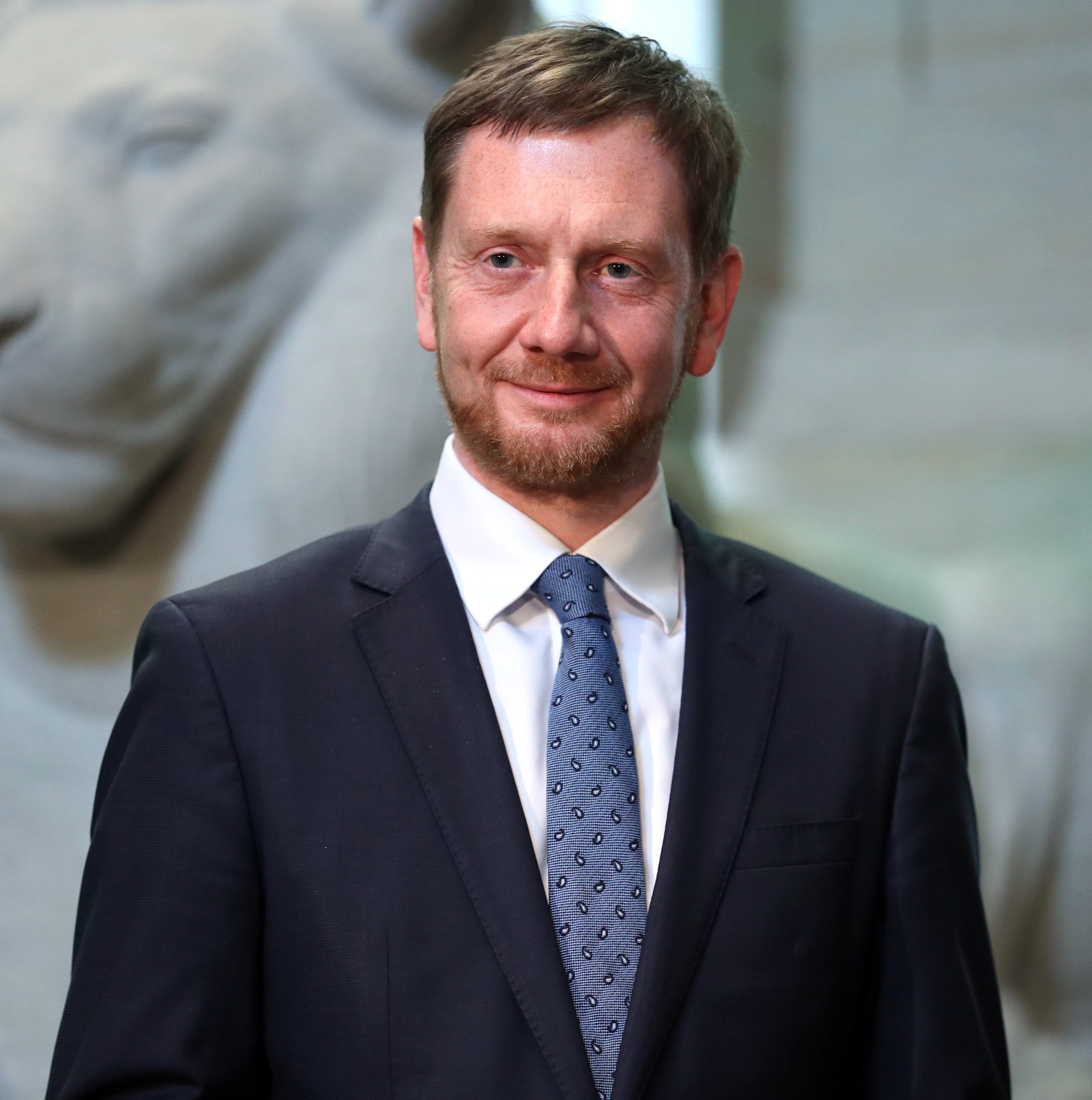
- Michael Kretschmer in March 2022
- Date formed: 20 December 2019
- Date dissolved: 19 December 2024

People and organisations
- Minister-President: Michael Kretschmer
- Deputy Minister-President: Wolfram Günther; Martin Dulig
- No. of ministers: 12
- Member parties: Christian Democratic Union; Alliance 90/The Greens; Social Democratic Party
- Status in legislature: Coalition government (Majority); 67 / 119 (56%)
- Opposition parties: Alternative for Germany; The Left

History
- Election: 2019 Saxony state election
- Legislature term: 7th Landtag of Saxony
- Predecessor: First Kretschmer cabinet
- Successor: Third Kretschmer cabinet

The Second Kretschmer cabinet was the state government of Saxony from 2019 to 2024. It was sworn in on 20 December 2019 after Michael Kretschmer was elected as Minister-President of Saxony by the members of the Landtag of Saxony. It is the 10th Cabinet of Saxony.

It was formed after the 2019 Saxony state election by the Christian Democratic Union (CDU), Alliance 90/The Greens (GRÜNE), and Social Democratic Party (SPD). Excluding the Minister-President, the cabinet comprises twelve ministers. Seven are members of the CDU, two are members of the Greens, two are members of the SPD, and one is an independent politician.

== Formation ==
The previous cabinet was a coalition government of the CDU and SPD led by Minister-President Michael Kretschmer.

The election took place on 1 September 2019, and resulted in significant losses for both governing parties. The opposition AfD achieved a major swing and became the second-largest party behind the CDU. The Left also suffered losses, while the Greens recorded a modest improvement and moved into fourth place ahead of the SPD.

Overall, the incumbent coalition lost its majority. The CDU ruled out cooperation with the AfD or The Left, leaving a Kenya coalition of the CDU, Greens, and SPD as the only practical option. The latter two parties stated they were open to discussions. Minister-President Krestchmer said he expected an unusually long period of negotiations due to the differences between the parties; the Saxony CDU is considered one of the most conservative party associations in Germany and particularly opposed to the Greens. The SPD called for exploratory talks the day after the election; on 7 September, the CDU and Greens also voted to open discussions. Meetings began a week later.

On 3 October, the three parties announced that exploratory talks had concluded successfully. The CDU and SPD voted on 11 October to begin coalition negotiations, followed by the Greens the next day. Discussions and meetings between working groups began during the week of 21 October. Negotiations continued to five weeks before an agreement was reached. The parties intended to unveil their draft agreement on 22 November, but were delayed by conflicts over the distribution of cabinet departments.

The coalition contract was presented on 1 December. It was approved by the CDU congress on 11 December, receiving the support of around 80% of delegates. The SPD and Greens both held membership ballots to approve the coalition. The results of the SPD vote were released on 16 December, with 74% voting in favour on 64% turnout. The Greens followed on 19 December, with 93% voting to approve the agreement.

Kretschmer was elected as Minister-President by the Landtag on 20 December 2019, winning 61 votes out of 118 cast. The coalition agreement was formally signed the same day, and the new cabinet sworn in.

== Composition ==
Portfolio	Minister	Party	Took office	Left office	State secretaries
Minister-President	Michael Kretschmer born 7 May 1975 (age 51)	CDU	20 December 2019	Incumbent	
First Deputy Minister-President Minister for Energy, Climate Protection, Environment and Agriculture	Wolfram Günther born 27 June 1973 (age 52)	GREENS	20 December 2019	Incumbent	Gerd Lippold; Gisela Reetz
Second Deputy Minister-President Minister for Economics, Labour and Transport	Martin Dulig born 26 February 1974 (age 52)	SPD	20 December 2019	Incumbent	Thomas Kralinski; Ines Fröhlich
Minister for Interior	Roland Wöller born 19 July 1970 (age 55)	CDU	20 December 2019	Incumbent	Thomas Rechentin
Minister for Finance	Hartmut Vorjohann born 4 June 1963 (age 62)	CDU	20 December 2019	Incumbent	Dirk Diedrichs
Minister for Justice, Democracy, Europe and Equality	Katja Meier born 10 September 1979 (age 46)	GREENS	20 December 2019	Incumbent	Mathias Weilandt; Gesine Märtens
Minister for Education	Christian Piwarz born 23 July 1975 (age 50)	CDU	20 December 2019	Incumbent	
Minister for Science	Sebastian Gemkow born 27 July 1978 (age 47)	CDU	20 December 2019	Incumbent	Andrea Franke
Minister for Culture and Tourism	Barbara Klepsch born 23 July 1965 (age 60)	CDU	20 December 2019	Incumbent	Andrea Franke
Minister for Social Affairs and Social Cohesion	Petra Köpping born 12 June 1958 (age 67)	SPD	20 December 2019	Incumbent	Sebastian Vogel; Dagmar Neukirch
Minister for Regional Development	Thomas Schmidt born 7 March 1961 (age 65)	CDU	20 December 2019	Incumbent	Frank Pfeil
Head of the State Chancellery; Minister for Federal Affairs and Media	Oliver Schenk born 14 August 1968 (age 57)	CDU	20 December 2019	Incumbent	Conrad Clemens (Representative to the Federal Government)
State Secretary for Digital Administration and Administrative Modernisation	Thomas Popp born 8 November 1961 (age 64)	Ind.	20 December 2019	Incumbent	
