= Max Roscher =

German politician (1888–1940)

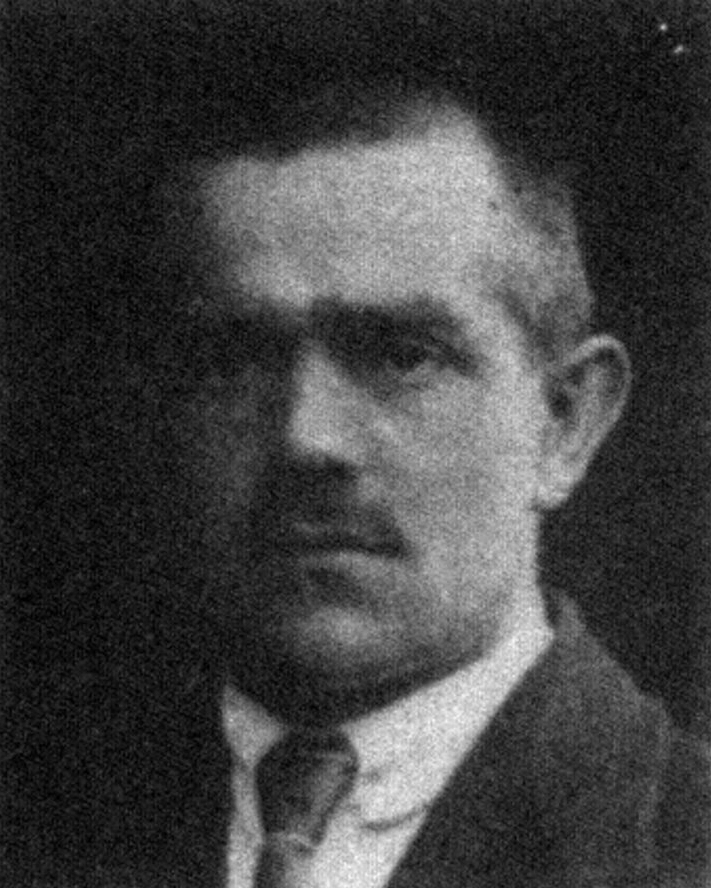
- Roscher c. 1924
- Born: 22 July 1888; Pockau, Erzgebirgskreis (Saxony), Germany
- Died: 28 August 1940; Peredelkino, Soviet Union
- Occupation: Politician
- Political party: KPD
- Spouse: Elisabeth
- Children: 1s, 1d

Max Roscher (22 July 1888 – 28 August 1940) was a German Communist politician who briefly served as a member of the Reichstag and, on a regional level, was a member of the Saxony legislature.

Like many of his generation he also served as a soldier, both in the First World War and, a couple of decades later, as an Internationalist in the Spanish Civil War.

== Life ==
Max Roscher was born in Pockau, a small town in the mining region of southern Saxony, close to the Flöha River. His father worked as a builder and/or cabinet maker. On leaving school he trained for work in the building trade before undertaking a period as an itinerant labourer between 1904 and 1908, working in building construction and in brick works. In 1911 he joined the Social Democratic Party (SPD / Sozialdemokratische Partei Deutschlands).

War broke out in August 1914 and Roscher was conscripted into the army. During the war he became a connected with the left-wing Spartacus League. War ended with German defeat, effectively in November 1918, and a year of national and local revolutions ensued. In December 1918 he was participating in the fighting surrounding the Munich "Workers' Council Republic, before returning to Saxony later in the month and becoming a member of the "Workers' and Soldiers' Council" in Marienberg. Like many Spartacus League supporters (and along with a large number of fellow SPD members locally), in March 1919 he joined the recently established German Communist Party. In 1920 he took on leadership of the party team in the Pockau subdistrict, while continuing till 1922 to work in building and construction. In 1923 he was sent by the party to Thuringia to become a full-time party organiser, based in Jena; but he returned to Pockau in the first part of 1924 and became a member of the town council.

In May 1924 he successfully stood for election in May 1924, representing the Communist Party, elected for the Chemnitz-Zwickau electoral district. His time in the national legislature (Reichstag) was relatively brief, however. After just seven months another general election was held in December 1924. The outcome was a loss of support for parties of the extreme left and the extreme right, which ushered in a period of relative political stability in Germany, but Max Roscher was one of those Communists who failed to secure re-election.

After his Reichstag career came to an end, Roscher became the regional party secretary for Agitation and Propaganda, for Chemnitz-Erzbirge. His arrest for "insurgency action" ("Aufstandsaktion") in February 1925 reflected his party responsibilities: he remained in prison till November 1925. However, in the 1926 regional elections he was able to stand for election as a Communist Party candidate, and he was elected a member of the Saxony regional legislature ("Landtag"), retaining his seat till 1929. During the comradely feuding that hit the Communist Party in 1928/29 Max Roscher stuck firmly to the party line laid down by the Central Committee, and remained a member of the party group in the regional assembly. He was also party head for the Flöha Valley sub-district from 1927 or 1928, transferring later to the same position for the Freiberg sub-district a short distance to the east. Early in 1931 he was arrested and in September of the same year sentenced to twenty months in prison for "preparation for high treason". However, his health was by now seen to be failing, and because of this he was released early. By September 1932 he was back in his position as party head for the Freiberg sub-district.

In January 1933 the NSDAP (Nazi Party) took power and lost little time in switching to one-party government in Germany. All political parties (other than the Nazi Party) were now illegal, but the new Chancellor had, in opposition, been particularly vitriolic about the Communist Party. In February 1933 Roscher emigrated to Czechoslovakia. He returned to Germany and settled in Dresden in August 1933, resuming his (now illegal) party work, but in December 1933 was back in Prague, in a hospital, thanks to his failing health. Subsequently, probably in 1934, the party sent him to Kharkiv (at that time in the Soviet Union) where he underwent a lengthy convalescence and also worked as an instructor for The Party. With the outbreak of the Spanish Civil War, in 1936, he joined the International Brigades. In Spain he fought in the Edgar André Bataillon. However, he was badly wounded in fighting outside Madrid in November 1936 after which he moved to Paris which was where the exiled German Communist Party had set up its headquarters. In April 1939 he was taken to the Soviet Union where he was accommodated in a rest home for wounded fighters from the Spanish Civil War, set up at Peredelkino, a dacha complex just outside Moscow. It was here that he would die in August 1940.

== Family connections ==
Max Roscher was the father of Paul Roscher, a successful politician in the German Democratic Republic and, between 1963 and 1989, a member of that country's powerful (ruling) Party Central Committee.

== Honours ==
The Second World War ended in May 1945 and what remained of Germany was divided into zones of occupation by the winning powers. Saxony, where Max Roscher had lived, became part of the Soviet occupation zone which, in October 1949, was relaunched as the Soviet sponsored German Democratic Republic. Within the new country there was much official adulation for the memory of Max Roscher. A military regiment was named "Schützenregiment 7 „Max Roscher“" in Marienberg: a torpedo vessel in the People's Navy was named the "Max Roscher". Technical colleges were named after him in Mülsen and in Borstendorf, as were a stockings and hosiery factory in Gornau, a youth hostel in Frauenstein, a major agricultural co-operative in Wernsdorf and a street in Freiberg.
