= Chancellery of Saxony =

The Chancellery of Saxony (or the Saxon Chancellery) may refer to:

- State Chancellery of Saxony: modern
- Electoral Chancellery of Saxony: historical
