= Georg-Ludwig von Breitenbuch =

German politicians

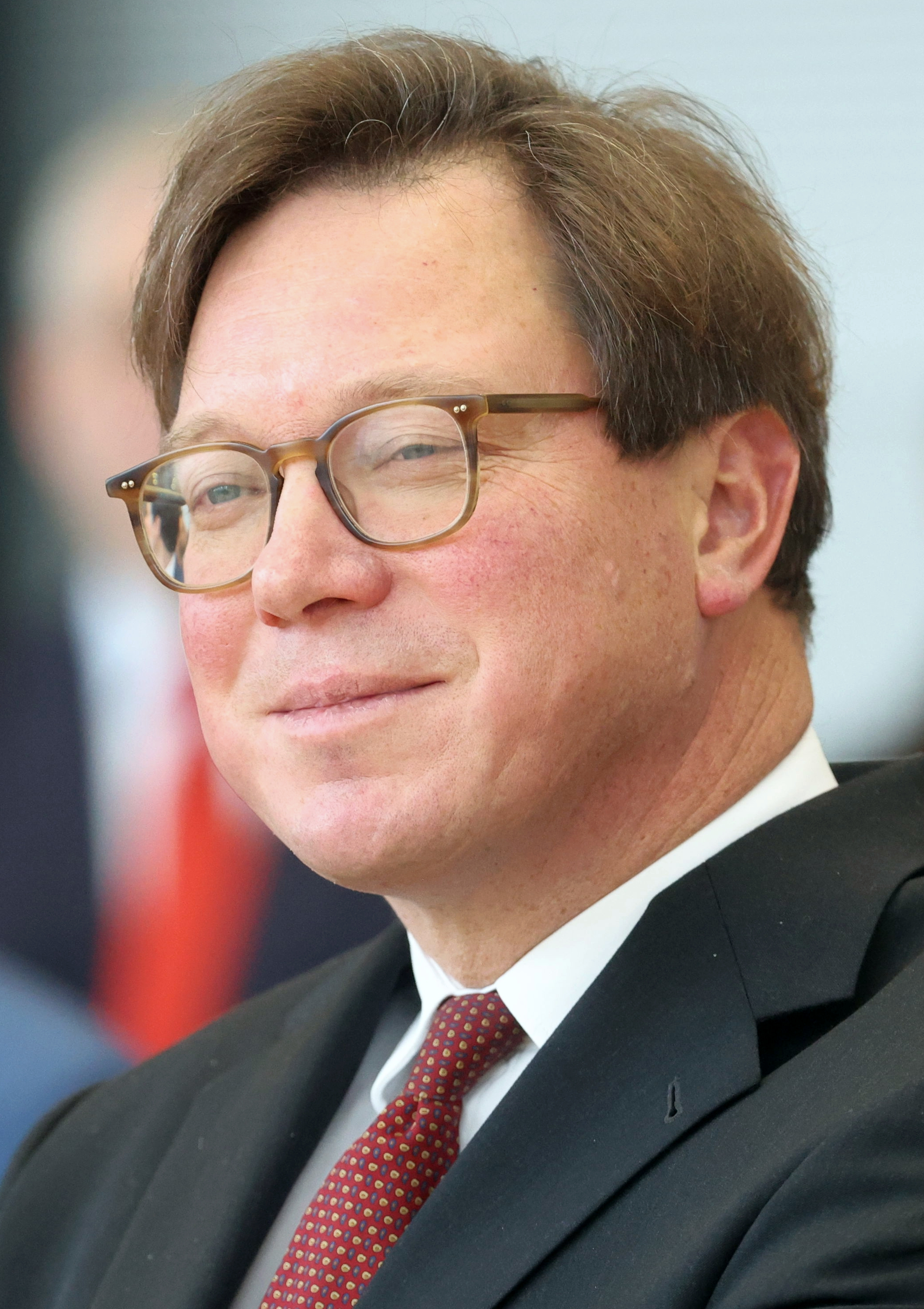

State Minister for the Environment and Agriculture
- Incumbent
- Assumed office 19 December 2024
- Minister-President: Michael Kretschmer

Personal details
- Born: 19 June 1971 (age 54) Göttingen, Germany
- Party: Christian Democratic Union of Germany

Georg-Ludwig von Breitenbuch (born 19 June 1971 in Göttingen, Germany) is a German politician. A member of the Christian Democratic Union (CDU), Breitenbuch has been serving as member of the Landtag of Saxony since 2009. He is serving as Saxony's State Minister for the Environment and Agriculture since December 19, 2024.

== Biography ==
Georg-Ludwig von Breitenbuch comes from an old Thuringian noble family and is the son of Ludwig von Breitenbuch and Yvonne von Breitenbuch, née Countess zu Ortenburg. After completing his Abitur in 1990, von Breitenbuch served a two-year term of military service as an officer candidate in a armored reconnaissance battalion. His final rank was lieutenant of the reserve. He subsequently completed a two-year agricultural apprenticeship, qualifying as a farmer. He studied Economics at the Humboldt University of Berlin and the Technical University of Dresden, graduating with a degree as a Diplom-Volkswirt. Since 1998, he has managed the family’s agricultural and forestry estate in Kohren-Sahlis. In addition, since 2004 he has been a member of the board of the Agrargenossenschaft Kohrener Land eG. For many years he served on the supervisory board of the local Volksbank. He is also a member of the synod of the Evangelical-Lutheran Church of Saxony.
