= Děčín Weir =

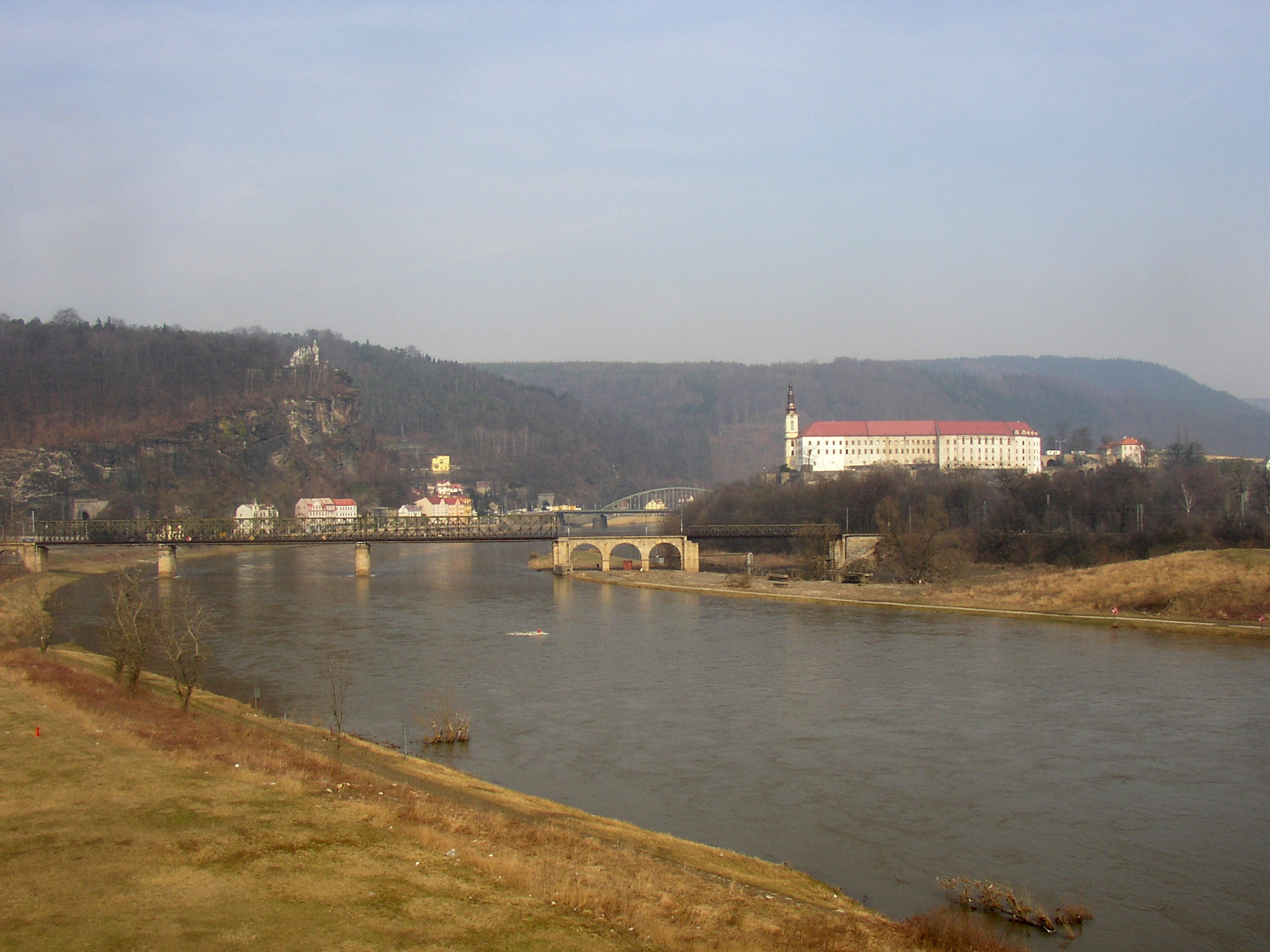
Decin castle over the Elbe

The Děčín Weir (Czech: Plavební stupeň Děčín) is a planned weir and lock complex on the Elbe River, in Děčín in the Ústí nad Labem Region of the Czech Republic.

== Description ==
The site of the proposed weir and lock system is between Děčín-Loubí and Děčín-Prostřední Žleb not far from the German border at river kilometre 737.02 (navigation km 98.98). It will consist of a weir, a lock, a small hydropower station and two fish ladders.

== Purpose ==
The Děčín weir is part of Czech attempts to improve navigation on the Elbe by increasing the regulation of flow. The declared aim is a draught of at least 140 cm on c. 345 days per year.

== Controversy ==
Opponents of the project question whether a measurable economic benefit can be achieved, since the navigability of the Elbe is also limited below the site by weather-driven interruptions. Thus is also concern that the Děčín weir will raise the pressure on Germany to establish similar structures on its section of the Elbe.

The project has also been criticised for its impact on the environment and on landscape and flood protection and, since 2000, there have been many objections, especially on the German side. The government of neighbouring Saxony is opposed to the weir: in 2005 the then Environment Minister, Stanislaw Tillich, intervened at the EU, to block its funding of the project and, in 2010, Environment Minister Frank Kupfer (both CDU) also objected and tested whether the project could be prevented if necessary by action.
