= Saxon Landtag (building) =

German Landtag building

Saxony Landtag
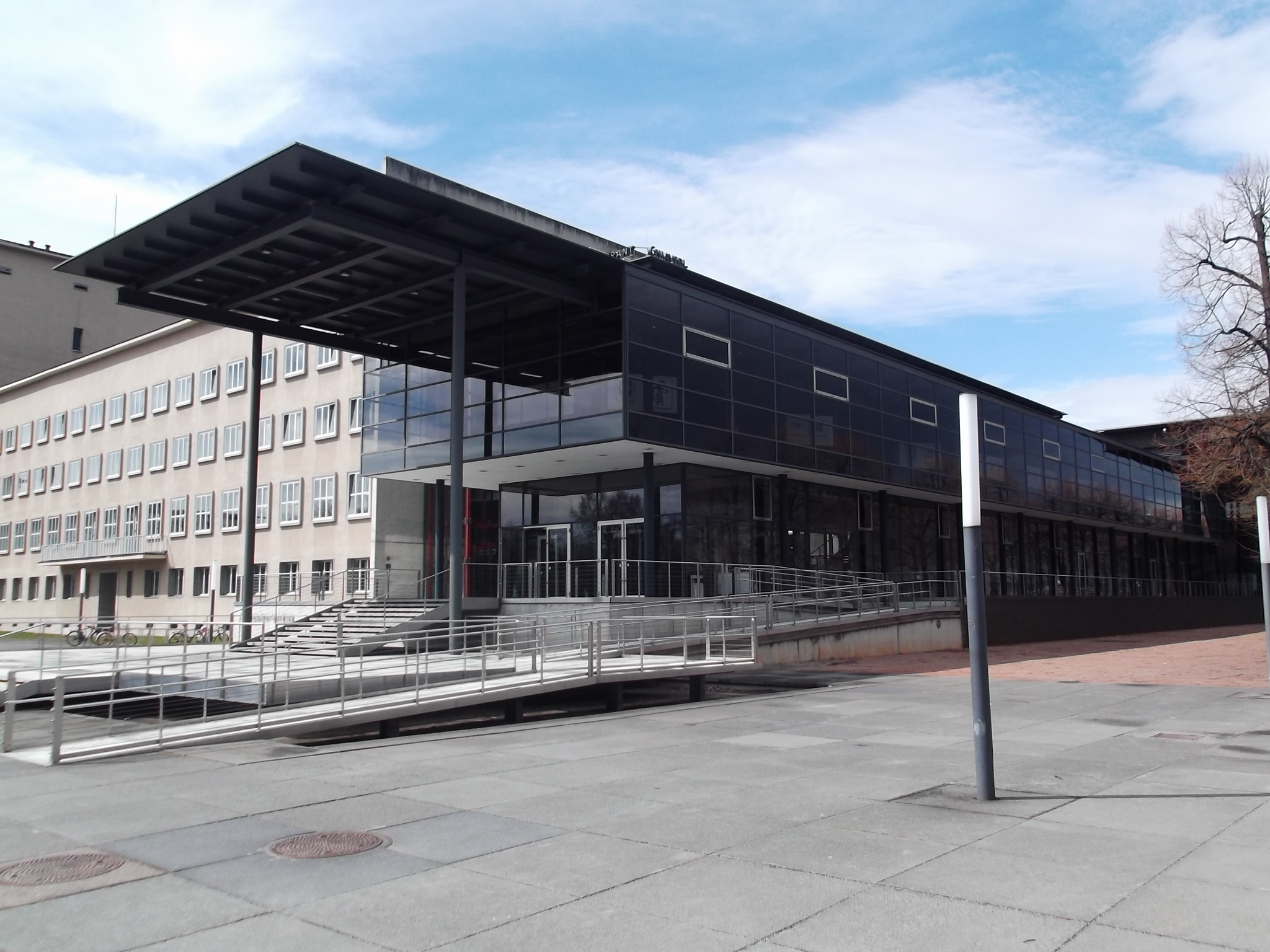
- The exterior of the building
- Interactive map of the Saxony Landtag area

General information
- Architectural style: Postmodern architecture
- Location: Bernhard-von-Lindenau square, Dresden, Germany
- Coordinates: 51°03′24″N 13°43′58″E
- Construction started: 1991
- Completed: 1993

Design and construction
- Architect: Peter Kulka

The Saxon Landtag (German: Sächsischer Landtag) is a building at the Bernhard von Lindenau Platz in Dresden, which serves as the seat of the landtag (state parliament) of Saxony, the Landtag of the Free State of Saxony.

== Overview ==
Characteristics of the building are the transparency of the glass facades and the exposed steel skeleton construction. The building, which won several awards, was designed by Peter Kulka and built between 1991 and 1993, following the German reunification. A special feature of the Landtagsgebäudes is the Bürgerfoyer, where regular exhibitions take place.

== History ==
After the collapse of East Germany, the Saxon Landtag had its seat from 27 October 1990 to 17 September 1993 in the Dreikönigskirche in the Innere Neustadt district. Since the church was not a permanent solution, a suitable solution was sought. At first, there was no doubt that the Parliament would move back into the house on the Brühl Terrace. The Sächsisches Ständehaus, erected by Paul Wallot, the Reichstag building architect, had been at the disposal of Parliament since 1907. It was not only its seemingly good construction, but above all the traditional relationship, that encouraged the reflections to use it again as a parliament building. However, closer scrutiny led to the realization that the museums, which had long been housed in the House of the Estates, with their important collections, were an unpredictable temporal uncertainty. Above all, however, the comparison between the use requirements of a modern parliament and the given structural requirements of 1907 suggested a different solution. Thus they decided to build a new building.

On 20 March 1991, the first realization competition for architecture in Saxony was praised. On 28 May of this year, the prize court of Winfried Sziegoleit was awarded to the architect Peter Kulka, who began the planning. On 1 October, the first demolition work began, and on 11 December 1991, the first groundbreaking ceremony followed. On 19 May 1992, the foundation stone was laid and in November one already celebrated the festivals of the new buildings.

On the occasion of the 3rd anniversary of the German Unity on 3 October 1993, a meeting was held in the new plenary hall. The first official meeting took place a few days later on 14 October 1993. However, the official transfer took place on 12 February 1994. On 1 February 1995, Kulka's office was commissioned to plan the reconstruction, reconstruction and extension work of the former building of the Landesfinanzamt in Dresden's Devrientstraße. This was built between 1928 and 1931 and was from 1946 to 1990 headquarters of the city and district management of the SED. On 15 September 1997, the building was officially handed over to the Landtag, which has been fully usable since then In the end, the Dutch Road was rebuilt before the Landtag from September to December 1999. On 6 December 1999, it received the new name Bernhard-von-Lindenau-Platz. As result of the 2002 Elbe Floodings the building was strongly affected. In the case of damage elimination, additional elements of preventive flood protection were implemented, for example, the transfer of the sensitive technical centers to the upper floor.
