= Sebastian Gemkow =

German politician

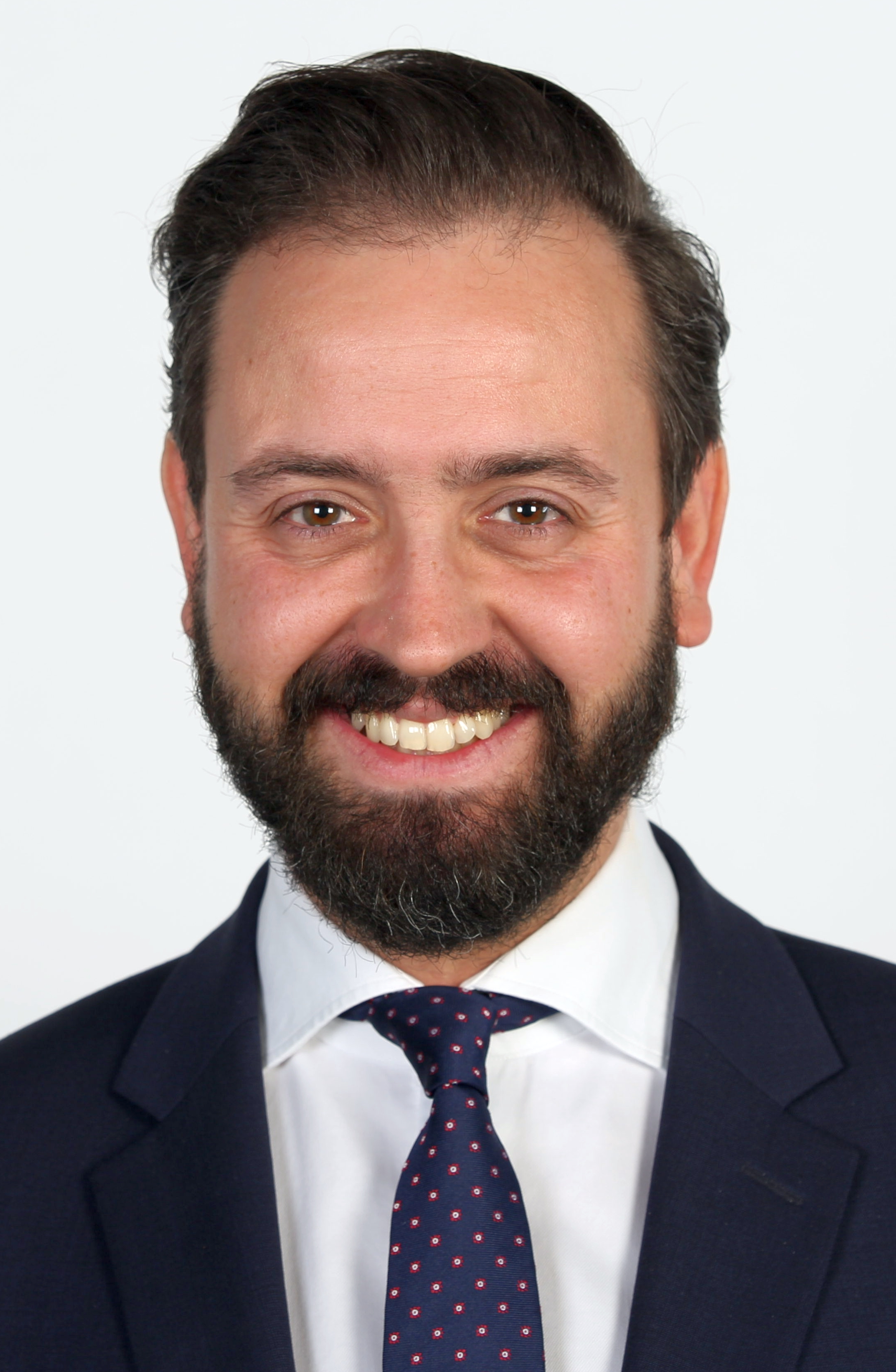
Sebastian Gemkow (2016)

Sebastian Gemkow (born 27 July 1978) is a German lawyer and politician of the Christian Democratic Union (CDU) who has been serving as State Minister of Science (since 2019) and as State Minister of Justice (2014–2019) in the governments of successive Minister-Presidents Stanislaw Tillich (2014–2018) and Michael Kretschmer (since 2017). Since 2009, he has been a member of the Landtag of the Free State of Saxony, the state's parliament.

== Early life and career ==
From 1998 to 2004, Gemkow studied law at the University of Leipzig, the University of Hamburg und the Humboldt University of Berlin. After he had successfully passed his first government licensing examination in 2004, he worked in Leipzig and also passed the second government licensing examination in 2006. After that, he settled as a lawyer in Leipzig. Until 2014, he also served as honorary consul of Estonia.

== Political career ==
Gemkow has been a member of the Christian Democratic Union since 1998.

Since the 2009 state elections, Gemkow has been a member of the Saxon State Parliament. In the Parliament, he first served as a member of the Committee on Science, Education, Culture and Media.

As one of the state's representatives at the Bundesrat, Gemkow is a member of the Committee on Legal Affairs. He is also a member of the German-Russian Friendship Group set up by the Bundesrat and the Russian Federation Council.

Gemkow was Saxon Minister of Justice from November 2014 to December 2019. He has been Saxony's Minister of Science since December 2019

In Leipzig's 2020 local elections, Gemkow won the first round of voting against incumbent mayor Burkhard Jung; however, he eventually lost in the runoff vote.

In the negotiations to form a Grand Coalition under the leadership of Friedrich Merz's Christian Democrats (CDU together with the Bavarian CSU) and the Social Democratic Party (SPD) following the 2025 German elections, Gemkow was part of the CDU/CSU delegation in the working group on education, research and innovation, led by Karin Prien, Katrin Staffler and Oliver Kaczmarek.

== Other activities ==
Since 2010 Gemkow has been the president of the Parliamentary Forum Mittel- und Osteuropa, which is a cross-party organization of the Saxon Parliament's members and responsible representatives of business and society. The goal of the organization is to promote the cooperation between political and administrative actors from Saxony and the Central and Eastern European countries in order to support economic, cultural and social development.

Additional positions include:

- Deutsches Museum, Member of the Board of Trustees
- Max Planck Institute for Chemical Physics of Solids, Member of the Board of Trustees
- Max Planck Institute for Mathematics in the Sciences, Member of the Board of Trustees
- Max Planck Institute of Molecular Cell Biology and Genetics, Member of the Board of Trustees
- Max Planck Institute for the Physics of Complex Systems, Member of the Board of Trustees

== Personal life ==
Gemkow is Evangelical Lutheran, married and has three children.
