= 1922 Saxony state election =

German state election

The 1922 Saxony state election was held on 5 November 1922 to elect the 96 members of the Landtag of Saxony.

== Results ==
Party	Votes	%	Seats	+/–
Social Democratic Party of Germany	1,060,247	41.78	40	+13
German National People's Party	482,469	19.01	19	–1
German People's Party	474,708	18.71	19	+1
Communist Party of Germany	266,864	10.52	10	+4
German Democratic Party	214,189	8.44	8	0
Centre Party	22,611	0.89	0	–1
German Social People's Community	11,358	0.45	0	New
Reich Party of the German Middle Class	5,137	0.20	0	New
Total	2,537,583	100.00	96	0
Valid votes	2,537,583	99.51		
Invalid/blank votes	12,385	0.49		
Total votes	2,549,968	100.00		
Registered voters/turnout	3,117,487	81.80		
Source: Elections in the Weimar Republic, Elections in Germany
