= Conrad Clemens =

German politician (born 1983)

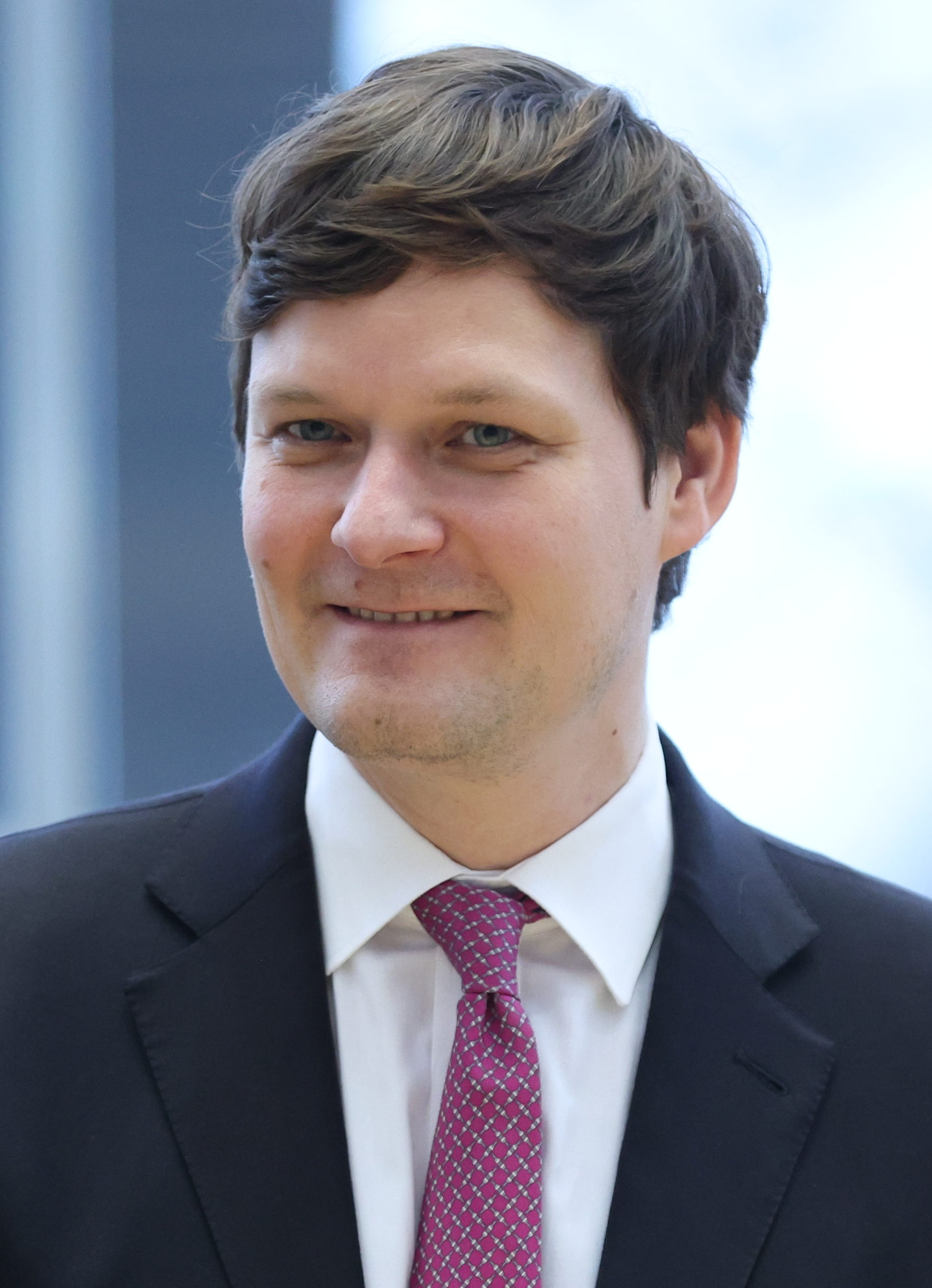
- Clemens in 2024

Minister of Culture of Saxony
- Incumbent
- Assumed office 19 December 2024
- Minister-President: Michael Kretschmer
- Preceded by: Christian Piwarz

Personal details
- Born: 4 January 1983 (age 43)
- Party: Christian Democratic Union

Conrad Clemens (born 4 January 1983) is a German politician serving as minister of culture of Saxony since 2024. From July to December 2024, he served as chief of the Saxon State Chancellery.
