= Wolfram Günther =

German politician

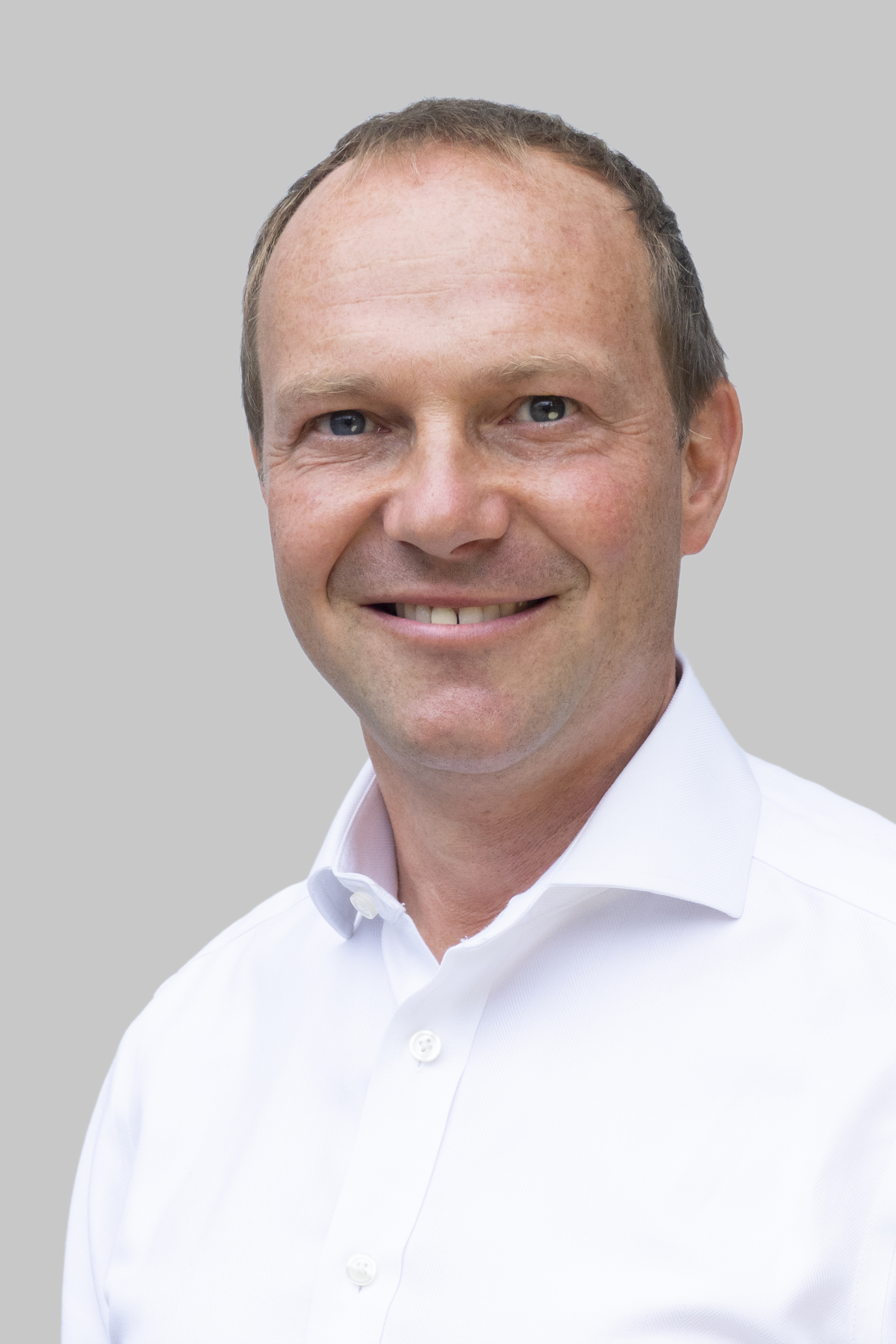
Wolfram Günther (2019)

Wolfram Günther (born 27 June 1973 in Leipzig) is a German lawyer and politician of Alliance 90/The Greens who has been serving as Vice Minister-President and State Minister for energy, climate protection, environment and agriculture in the coalition government of Saxony since 2019.

== Early life and education ==
From 1980 to 1990, Günther was a swimmer and was second winner at GDR swim championship in 1986. 1992 Günther worked for Dresdner Bank in Düsseldorf and later in Leipzig. From 1994 to 1999 he studied law at the University of Leipzig.

== Political career ==
In 1994, Günther became a member of Alliance 90/The Greens. 2014 he was elected to Saxony State parliament. In 2019 he became minister for energy, climate protection, environment and agriculture of Saxony.
