= Petra Köpping =

German politician (born 1958)

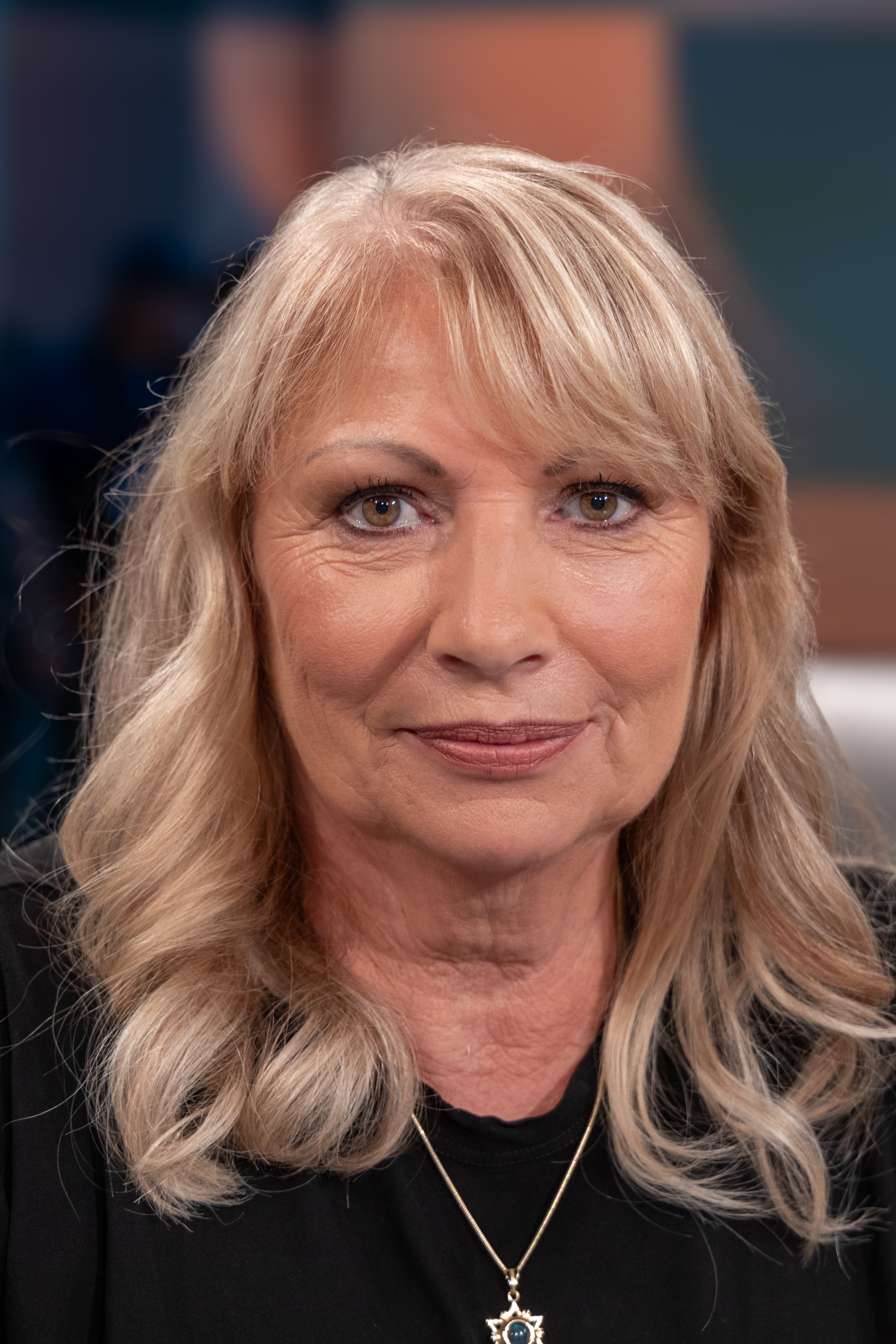
- Köpping in 2024

Member of the Landtag of Saxony
- Incumbent
- Assumed office 30 August 2009

Mayor of Großpösna
- In office 1994–2001
- In office 1989–1990

Personal details
- Born: Viola Petra Köpping; 12 June 1958 (age 68) Nordhausen, East Germany
- Party: SPD (2002–present)
- Other party: SED (1986–1989); Independent (1989–2002)
- Children: 3
- Education: Gymnasium St. Augustine
- Alma mater: German Academy of Sciences at Berlin
- Occupation: Political scientist • Politician

Viola Petra Köpping (born 12 June 1958) is a German politician of the Social Democratic Party (SPD) who has been serving as Saxony's Minister of State for Social Affairs and Social Cohesion in the Second Kretschmer cabinet since 2019. Previously from the Socialist Unity Party of Germany (SED), she was a member of the Landtag of Saxony from 2009 to 2019. She served as Saxony's Minister of State for Equality and Integration from 2014 to 2019. She was a candidate in the 2019 Social Democratic Party of Germany leadership election. She was her party's top candidate in the 2024 Saxony state election.

In June 2025, she became SPD Vice-President.

== Early life and education ==
After Köpping completed her Abitur at the Ernst Schneller extended high school in Grimma in 1977, she was appointed deputy mayor of the municipality of Großsteinberg. She then worked for the Grimma district council from 1979 to 1987 and in 1980 began a distance learning course in political science and law at the German Academy of Political Science and Law, which she completed in 1985 with a degree in constitutional law.

== Early career ==
From 1987 to 1988 she worked for the Leipzig city council and from 1989 to 1990 she was mayor of the municipality of Großpösna. After the fall of the Berlin Wall, she worked as a field representative for the German Employees' Health Insurance Fund from 1990 to 1994, before taking up the office of mayor in Großpösna for a second time, a position she held until she was elected district administrator for the Leipziger Land district in 2001. From 2008 to 2009 she worked as a consultant to the Development Bank of Saxony.

== Political career ==
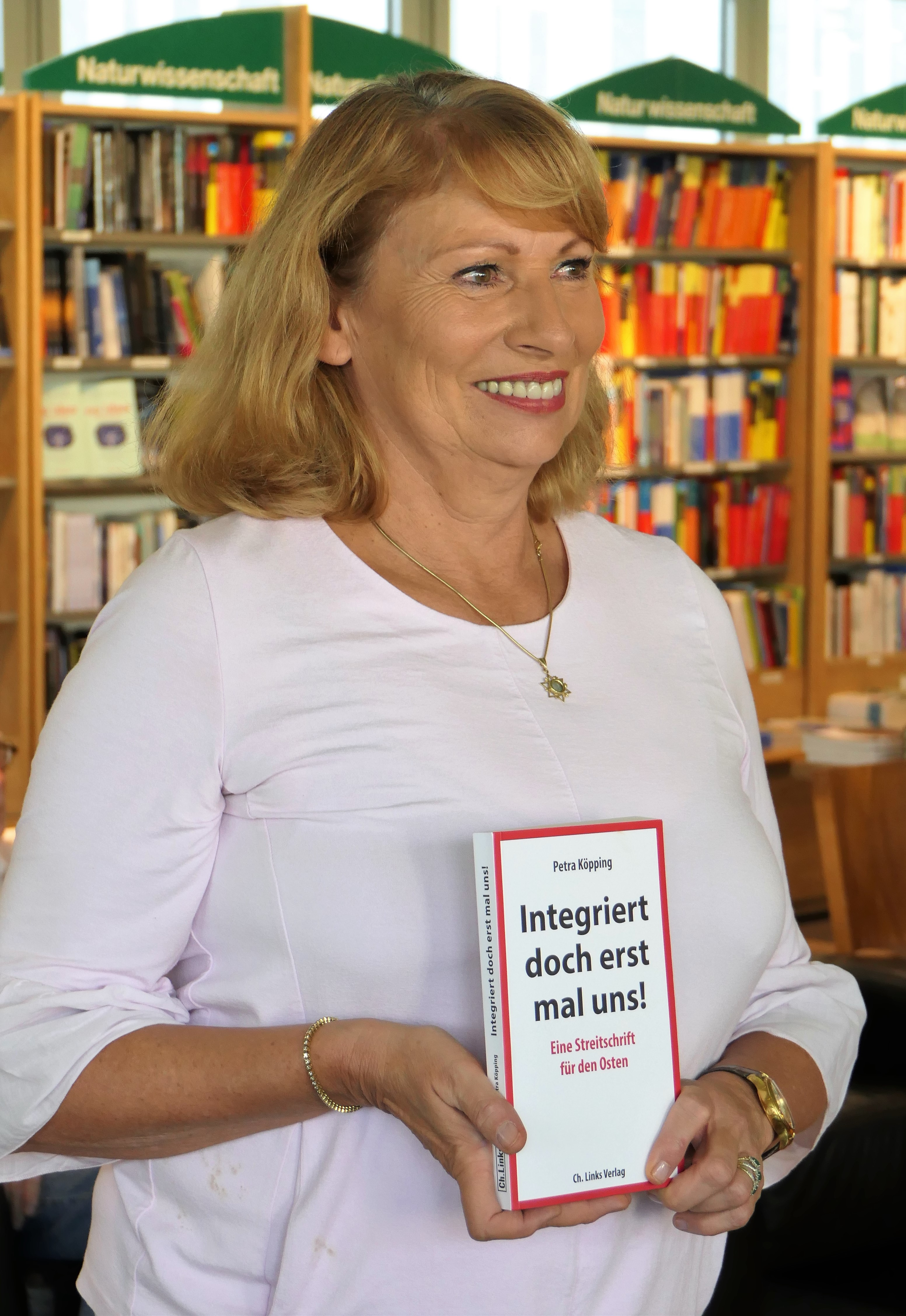
Petra Köpping at the presentation of her "Polite Paper for the East" (2018)

=== Early beginnings ===
Köpping was a member of the SED from 1986 to June 1989. In August 2002 she became a member of the SPD. She was deputy chairwoman of the SPD Saxony from 2006 to 2016.

In 1994, Köpping was elected mayor of Großpösna for a second time. She held this office until 2001, when she was elected district administrator of the Leipziger Land district. In the election of the district administrator of the Leipzig district, which was newly formed as part of the 2008 Saxony district reform as a merger of the previous Leipziger Land district and the Muldentalkreis district, she lost in the runoff election on 22 June 2008, to her CDU competitor and previous colleague Gerhard Gey.

In the 2009 Saxony state election, she was elected to the Landtag of Saxony via fourth place on the state list and was a member of the Committee on Economic Affairs, Labour and Transport as well as the Committee on Internal Affairs.

=== Career in state government ===
On 13 November 2014, Köpping was appointed by the then Prime Minister Stanislaw Tillich as the first Saxon State Minister for Equality and Integration in the Third Tillich Cabinet. She headed the Equality and Integration Division in the State Ministry for Social Affairs and Consumer Protection with the topics of equality, integration of immigrants and the promotion of democracy.

In her speech on the Political Reformation Day on 31 October 2016, in Leipzig, which focused on the post-reunification period, Köpping stated that after the liquidation of the "desolate GDR industry", the Treuhand had left behind an "uprooted workforce" that was not allowed to grieve. The "grassroots democratic moment of glory" of the round tables had been ignored and the "sting of humiliation in the flesh of many East Germans" was deep - not only among those who lost out. The feelings and experiences of hurt, humiliation and anger from that time must be honestly dealt with. Neither should distrust of democracy be further stoked nor should people be played off against each other. Köpping therefore firmly and explicitly rejected racism and xenophobia.

In her 2018 book Integriert doch erst mal uns, she also argues along these lines and calls for repairing "whatever is possible", such as injustices in wages and pensions. Köpping also suggested the formation of a German commission to examine the early post-reunification period.

In August 2019, she announced her candidacy for SPD chairwoman in a duo with her party colleague Boris Pistorius. In the first round of voting, the duo received 14.61% of the votes, thus eliminating them from the race for the party chairmanship.

In the 2019 Saxony state election, she was re-elected to the Landtag of Saxony via second place on the state list. After her appointment as Minister of Social Affairs, she announced that she would be resigning from her mandate. Simone Lang took her place.

In the wake of the COVID-19 pandemic, the Saxon Ministry of Social Affairs, headed by Petra Köpping, announced in spring 2020 that so-called "quarantine refusers" would be detained in psychiatric hospitals and prepared for their involuntary commitment to a psychiatric institution. The corresponding decree was withdrawn a short time later by Prime Minister, Michael Kretschmer citing "people's concerns".

In May 2021, Köpping resigned from her seat in the Leipzig district council, citing the heavy workload as minister.

On 3 December 2021, a torchlight procession took place in front of her private residence. After the right-wing Alternative for Germany also distanced itself from the action, members of the party tried to demonstrate in front of Köpping's property on January 26, 2022. This was stopped by police forces.

In August 2023, an audit report by the State Audit Office was made public, which revealed various deficiencies in Köpping's Ministry of Social Affairs. Serious deficiencies in the area of support for associations for the promotion of integration and democracy were revealed and structures at risk of corruption were reported. The State Audit Office criticized the fact that there were close personal ties with supported associations, and in addition, the SPD was supported, although according to the report there were only inadequate checks on the necessity and appropriateness.

On 25 September 2023, Köpping was presented as the top candidate for the SPD Saxony for the 2024 Saxony state election after being unanimously nominated by the state executive committee. At the state party conference of the SPD Saxony on 25 November 2023, in Neukieritzsch, Köpping was officially elected as the top candidate with 97 percent of the delegates' votes. The state election conference in Frankenberg elected Köpping with 96 percent of the delegates' votes to first place on the Saxon state list, thus confirming her in her top candidacy. In the election she was re-elected and continued with the health portfolio.

In the negotiations to form a Grand Coalition under the leadership of Friedrich Merz's Christian Democrats (CDU together with the Bavarian CSU) and the SPD following the 2025 German elections, Köpping was part of the SPD delegation in the working group on health, led by Karl-Josef Laumann, Stephan Pilsinger and Katja Pähle.

== Personal life ==
Köpping lives in Grimma-Höfgen. She is married and has three children from a previous marriage.

== Publications ==
- Köpping, Petra (2018). Integriert doch erst mal uns! Eine Streitschrift für den Osten (in German). Ch. Links. ISBN 978-3-96289-009-4.
