= Dirk Panter =

German politician (born 1974)

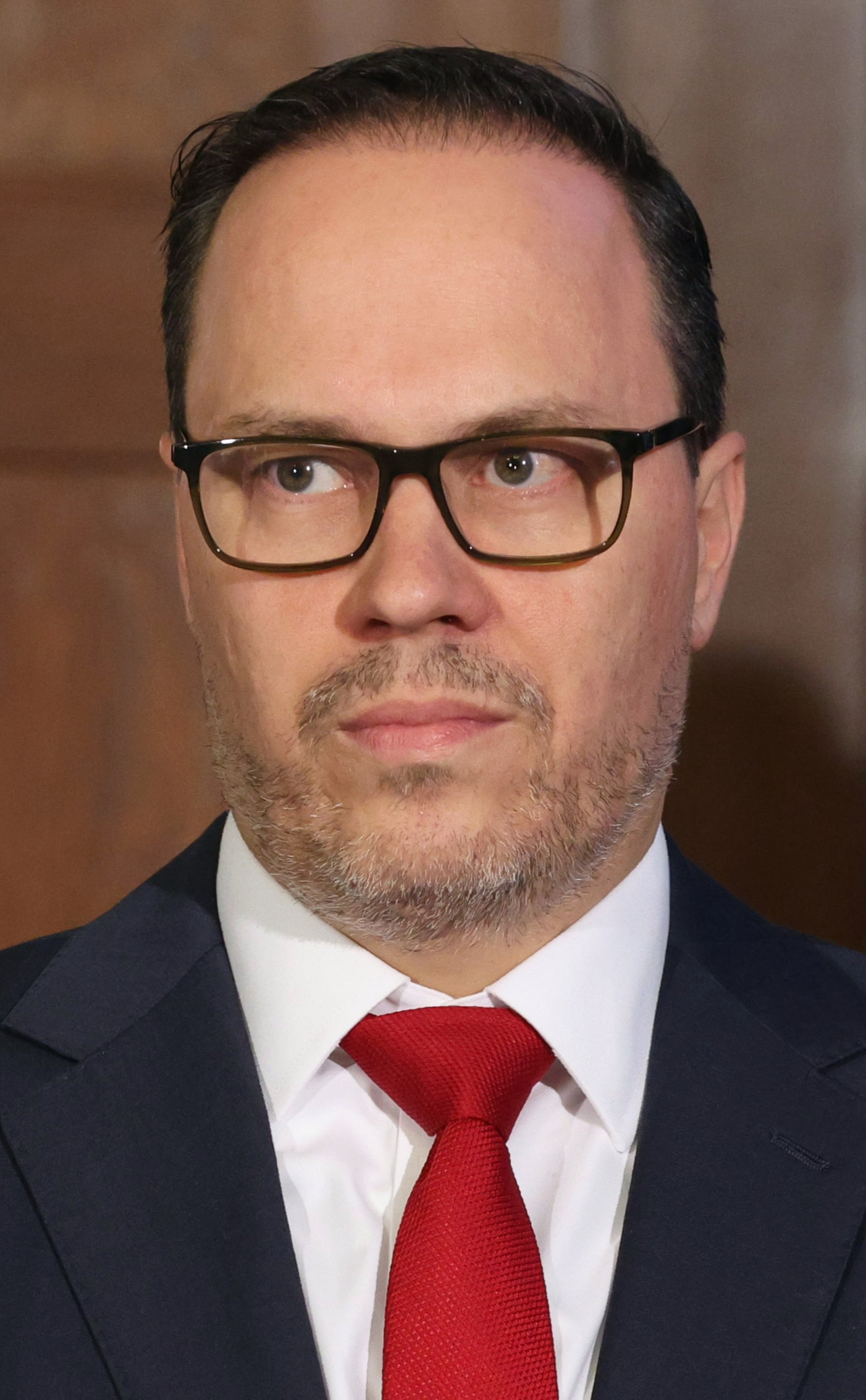
- Panter in 2024

Minister of Economic Affairs, Labour, Energy and Climate Protection of Saxony
- Incumbent
- Assumed office 19 December 2024
- Minister-President: Michael Kretschmer

Personal details
- Born: 7 February 1974 (age 52) Achern
- Party: Social Democratic Party (since 1997)

Dirk Matthias Panter (born 7 February 1974 in Achern) is a German politician serving as minister of economic affairs, labour, energy and climate protection of Saxony since 2024. He has been a member of the Landtag of Saxony since 2009.
