= Christian Piwarz =

German politician

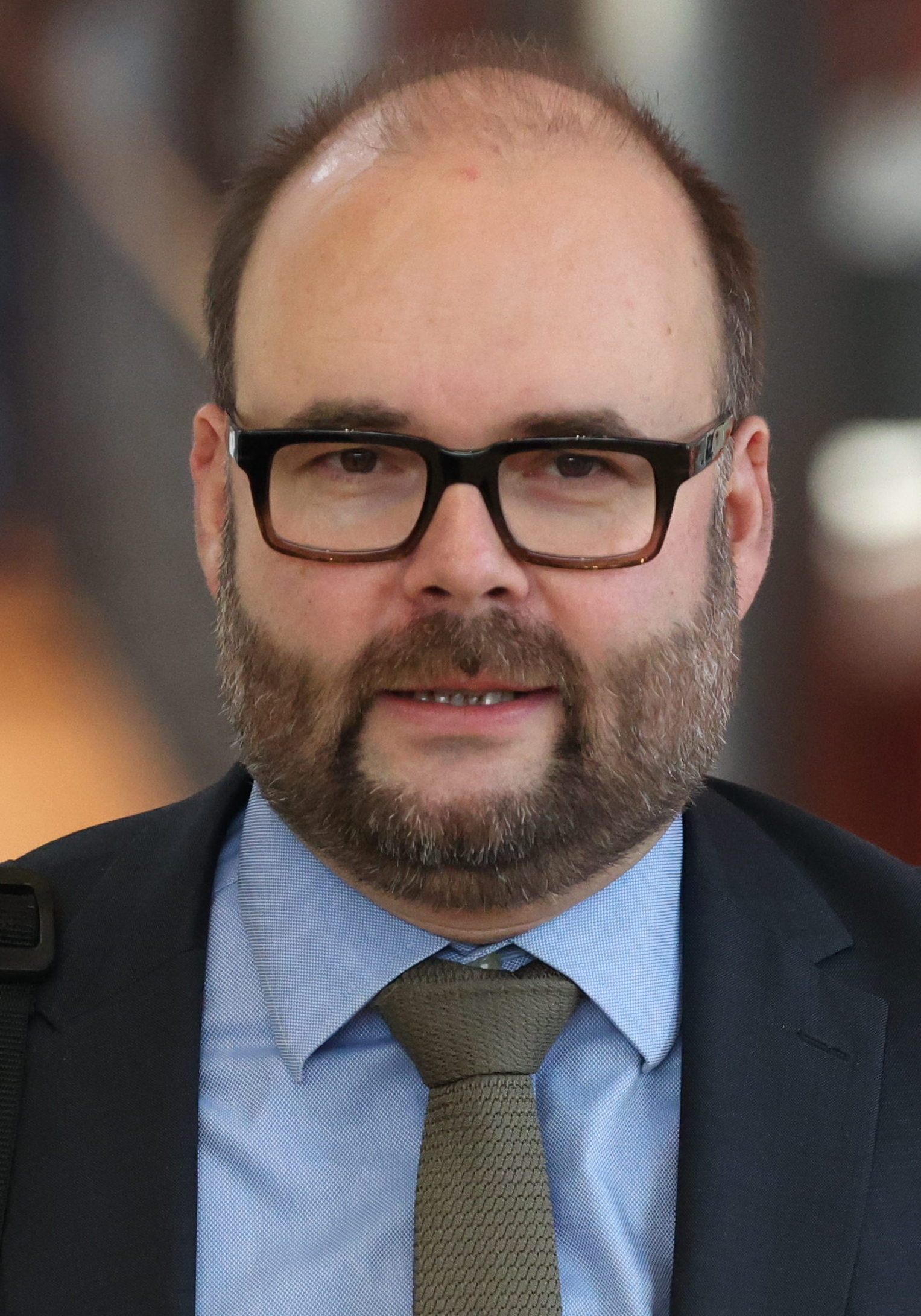

State Minister of Finance
- Incumbent
- Assumed office 19 December 2024
- Minister-President: Michael Kretschmer

Personal details
- Born: 23 July 1975 (age 51) Dresden, East Germany (now Germany)
- Education: TU Dresden

Christian Piwarz (born 23 July 1975 in Dresden) is a German lawyer and politician of the Christian Democratic Union (CDU).

== Political career ==
Piwarz served as state chairman of the Junge Union Sachsen und Niederschlesien.

Piwarz has served as a member of the State Parliament of Saxony since 2006 and held the position of State Minister for Culture in the Kretschmer I and Kretschmer II cabinets from 2017 to 2024.

On December 19, 2024, Prime Minister Michael Kretschmer appointed Piwarz as State Minister of Finance in the Third Kretschmer cabinet.

== Other activities ==
- Pension Institution of the Federal and State Governments (VBL), Chair of the Supervisory Board (since 2025)
- KfW, Member of the Board of Supervisory Directors (since 2025)
- Leipzig Trade Fair, Ex-Officio Member of the Supervisory Board (since 2024)
