= Barbara Klepsch =

German politician (born 1965)

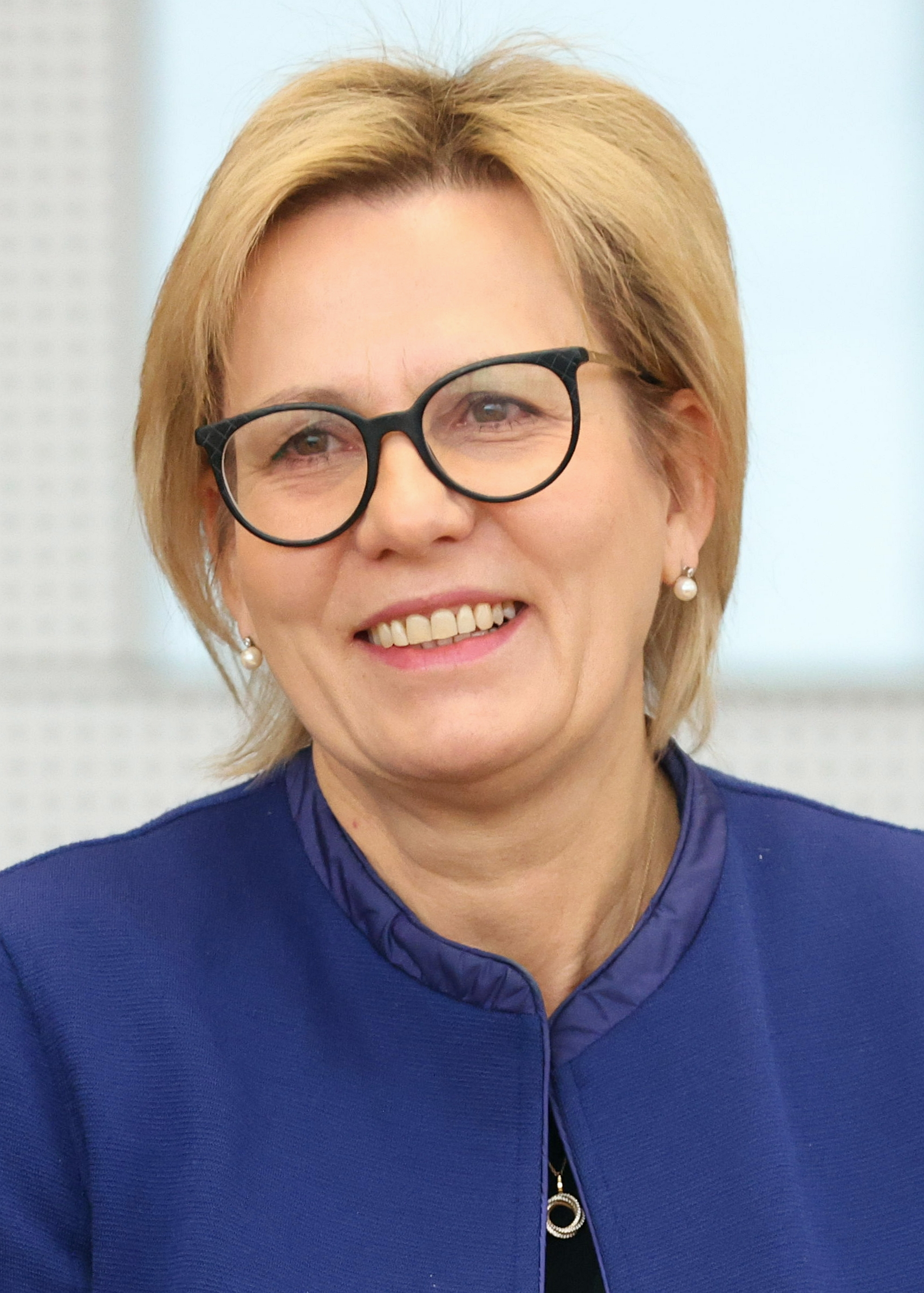
- Klepsch in 2024

Minister of Culture and Tourism of Saxony
- Incumbent
- Assumed office 20 December 2019
- Minister-President: Michael Kretschmer
- Preceded by: Christian Piwarz

Personal details
- Born: 23 July 1965 (age 60)
- Party: Christian Democratic Union

Barbara Klepsch (born 23 July 1965) is a German politician serving as minister of culture and tourism of Saxony since 2019. She has been a member of the Landtag of Saxony since 2019. From 2014 to 2019, she served as minister of social affairs and consumer protection. From 2001 to 2014, she served as mayor of Annaberg-Buchholz.
