= List of minister-presidents of Saxony =

This article lists the leaders of the government (German: Vorsitzende des Gesamtministeriums) in the Kingdom of Saxony from 1831 to 1918 and minister-presidents (German: Ministerpräsidenten) of the Free State of Saxony since 1918.

== List of minister-presidents ==
=== Kingdom of Saxony (until 1918) ===
Political party: DVP None

Portrait	Name (Birth–Death)	Term of office			Political party
Portrait	Name (Birth–Death)	Took office	Left office	Time in office	Political party
Kingdom of Saxony (until 1871)
Independent member state of the German Confederation and the North German Confederation.
	Bernhard August von Lindenau (1779–1854)	1 December 1831	September 1843	11 years, 9 months	Non-partisan
	Julius Traugott Jakob von Könneritz (1792–1866)	September 1843	13 March 1848	4 years, 6 months	Non-partisan
	Alexander Karl Hermann Braun (1807–1868)	16 March 1848	24 February 1849	345 days	Non-partisan
	Gustav Friedrich Held (1804–1857)	24 February 1849	2 May 1849	67 days	Non-partisan
	Ferdinand von Zschinsky (1797–1858)	2 May 1849	28 October 1858	9 years, 179 days	Non-partisan
	Friedrich Ferdinand von Beust (1809–1886)	28 October 1858	15 August 1866	7 years, 291 days	Non-partisan
	Johann Paul von Falkenstein (1801–1882)	October 1866	18 January 1871	4 years, 3 months	Non-partisan
Kingdom of Saxony (1871–1918)
State of the German Reich during the period of the German Empire.
	Johann Paul von Falkenstein (1801–1882)	18 January 1871	1 October 1871	256 days	Non-partisan
	Richard Freiherr von Friesen (1808–1884)	1 October 1871	1 November 1876	5 years, 31 days	Non-partisan
	Georg Friedrich Alfred Graf von Fabrice (1818–1891)	1 November 1876	25 March 1891	14 years, 144 days	Non-partisan
	Carl Friedrich Wilhelm von Gerber (1823–1891)	25 March 1891	23 December 1891	273 days	Non-partisan
	Hans von Thümmel (1824–1895)	December 1891	12 February 1895	3 years, 2 months	Non-partisan
	Heinrich Rudolf Schurig (1835–1901)	12 February 1895	15 June 1901	6 years, 123 days	Non-partisan
	Karl Georg Levin von Metzsch-Reichenbach (1836–1927)	15 June 1901	30 April 1906	4 years, 319 days	Non-partisan
	Konrad Wilhelm von Rüger (1837–1916)	30 April 1906	1 December 1910	4 years, 215 days	Non-partisan
	Victor Alexander von Otto (1852–1912)	1 December 1910	21 May 1912	1 year, 172 days	Non-partisan
	Max Clemens Lothar Freiherr von Hausen (1846–1922)	26 July 1912	21 May 1914	1 year, 299 days	Non-partisan
	Heinrich Gustav Beck (1854–1933)	21 May 1914	26 October 1918	4 years, 158 days	Non-partisan
	Rudolf Heinze (1865–1928)	26 October 1918	13 November 1918	18 days	German People's Party

=== Free State of Saxony (1918–1952) ===
Political party: USPD SPD / ASPD DVP NSDAP SED

Portrait	Name (Birth–Death)	Term of office			Political party	Cabinet	Landtag
Portrait	Name (Birth–Death)	Took office	Left office	Time in office	Political party	Cabinet	Landtag
Free State of Saxony (1918–1933)
State of the German Reich during the period of the Weimar Republic.
	Richard Lipinski (1867–1936)	15 November 1918	21 January 1919	67 days	Independent Social Democratic Party	Council of People's Deputies; SPD–USPD	–
	Georg Gradnauer (1866–1946)	21 January 1919	4 May 1920	1 year, 104 days	Social Democratic Party	Council of People's Deputies; SPD	–
	Georg Gradnauer (1866–1946)	21 January 1919	4 May 1920	1 year, 104 days	Social Democratic Party	Gradnauer; SPD–DDP	People's Chamber; Feb. 1919
	Wilhelm Buck (1869–1945)	4 May 1920	21 March 1923	2 years, 321 days	Social Democratic Party	Buck I SPD–DDP	People's Chamber; Feb. 1919
	Wilhelm Buck (1869–1945)	4 May 1920	21 March 1923	2 years, 321 days	Social Democratic Party	Buck II; SPD–USPD	1 Nov. 1920
	Wilhelm Buck (1869–1945)	4 May 1920	21 March 1923	2 years, 321 days	Social Democratic Party	Buck III; SPD	2 Nov. 1922
	Erich Zeigner (1886–1949)	21 March 1923	29 October 1923	222 days	Social Democratic Party	Zeigner; SPD; From 12 Oct. 1923: SPD–KPD	2 Nov. 1922
	Rudolf Heinze (1865–1928)	Reichskommissar		2 days	German People's Party	–	2 Nov. 1922
	Rudolf Heinze (1865–1928)	29 October 1923	31 October 1923	2 days	German People's Party	–	2 Nov. 1922
	Alfred Fellisch (1884–1973)	31 October 1923	4 January 1924	65 days	Social Democratic Party	Fellisch; SPD	2 Nov. 1922
	Max Heldt (1872–1933)	4 January 1924	26 June 1929	5 years, 173 days	Social Democratic Party	Heldt I SPD–DVP–DDP; From 25 Mar. 1926: ASPD–DVP–DDP	2 Nov. 1922
	Max Heldt (1872–1933)	4 January 1924	26 June 1929	5 years, 173 days	After 25 Mar. 1926: Non-partisan	Heldt I SPD–DVP–DDP; From 25 Mar. 1926: ASPD–DVP–DDP	2 Nov. 1922
	Max Heldt (1872–1933)	4 January 1924	26 June 1929	5 years, 173 days	After 6 Jun. 1926: Old Social Democratic Party	Heldt I SPD–DVP–DDP; From 25 Mar. 1926: ASPD–DVP–DDP	2 Nov. 1922
	Max Heldt (1872–1933)	4 January 1924	26 June 1929	5 years, 173 days	After 6 Jun. 1926: Old Social Democratic Party	Heldt II; DVP–WP–DDP–ASPD	3 Oct. 1926
	Max Heldt (1872–1933)	4 January 1924	26 June 1929	5 years, 173 days	After 6 Jun. 1926: Old Social Democratic Party	Heldt III; DNVP–DVP–WP–DDP–VRP–ASPD	3 Oct. 1926
	Wilhelm Bünger (1870–1937)	26 June 1929	18 February 1930	237 days	German People's Party	Bünger; DVP–WP–DNVP–ASPD	4 May 1929
	Walther Schieck (1874–1946)	6 May 1930	30 January 1933	2 years, 269 days	German People's Party	Schieck; DVP–DDP	5 Jun. 1930
Free State of Saxony (1933–1945)						Schieck; DVP–DDP	5 Jun. 1930
State of the German Reich during the period of Nazi Germany.						Schieck; DVP–DDP	5 Jun. 1930
	Walther Schieck (1874–1946)	30 January 1933	10 March 1933	39 days	German People's Party	Schieck; DVP–DDP	5 Jun. 1930
	Manfred Freiherr von Killinger (1886–1944)	Reichkomissar		56 days	Nazi Party	–	
	Manfred Freiherr von Killinger (1886–1944)	10 March 1933	5 May 1933	56 days	Nazi Party	–	
	Manfred Freiherr von Killinger (1886–1944)	Ministerpräsident		1 year, 299 days	Nazi Party	–	
	Manfred Freiherr von Killinger (1886–1944)	5 May 1933	28 February 1935	1 year, 299 days	Nazi Party	–	
	Martin Mutschmann (1879–1947)	Reichsstatthalter		12 years, 3 days	Nazi Party	–	
	Martin Mutschmann (1879–1947)	5 May 1933	8 May 1945	12 years, 3 days	Nazi Party	–	
	Martin Mutschmann (1879–1947)	Ministerpräsident		10 years, 69 days	Nazi Party	–	
	Martin Mutschmann (1879–1947)	28 February 1935	8 May 1945	10 years, 69 days	Nazi Party	–	
State of Saxony (1945–1952)
Soviet occupation zone in Germany
	Rudolf Friedrichs (1892–1947)	1 July 1945	13 June 1947	1 year, 347 days	Social Democratic Party	Friedrichs I SPD–KPD–LDP–CDU; From 22 Apr. 1946: SED–LDP–CDU	Consultative Assembly
	Rudolf Friedrichs (1892–1947)	1 July 1945	13 June 1947	1 year, 347 days	After 22 April 1946: Socialist Unity Party	Friedrichs I SPD–KPD–LDP–CDU; From 22 Apr. 1946: SED–LDP–CDU	Consultative Assembly
	Rudolf Friedrichs (1892–1947)	1 July 1945	13 June 1947	1 year, 347 days	After 22 April 1946: Socialist Unity Party	Friedrichs II; SED–LDP–CDU	1 Oct. 1946
	Max Seydewitz (1892–1987)	31 July 1947	7 October 1949	2 years, 68 days	Socialist Unity Party	Seydewitz I SED–LDP–CDU–DBD	1 Oct. 1946
State of the German Democratic Republic (1949–1952)
	Max Seydewitz (1892–1987)	7 October 1949	23 July 1952	2 years, 290 days	Socialist Unity Party	Seydewitz II; SED–CDU–LDP–DBD–NDPD–FDGB	2 Oct. 1950
From 23 July 1952 until 3 October 1990, Free State of Saxony was abolished.

=== Free State of Saxony (1990–present) ===
Political party: CDU

Portrait	Name (Birth–Death)	Term of office			Political party	Cabinet
Portrait	Name (Birth–Death)	Took office	Left office	Days	Political party	Cabinet
In accordance with the Unification Treaty, the designated state commissioner Rudolf Krause (CDU) served as head of government from 3 to 27 October 1990.
1	Kurt Biedenkopf (1930–2021)	27 October 1990	18 April 2002 (resigned)	11 years, 173 days	CDU	I II III
2	Georg Milbradt (born 1945)	18 April 2002	28 May 2008 (resigned)	6 years, 40 days	CDU	I II
3	Stanislaw Tillich (born 1959)	28 May 2008	13 December 2017 (resigned)	9 years, 199 days	CDU	I II III
4	Michael Kretschmer (born 1975)	13 December 2017	Incumbent	8 years, 237 days	CDU	I II III

== See also ==
- List of rulers of Saxony
