= Stanislaw Tillich =

German politician (born 1959)

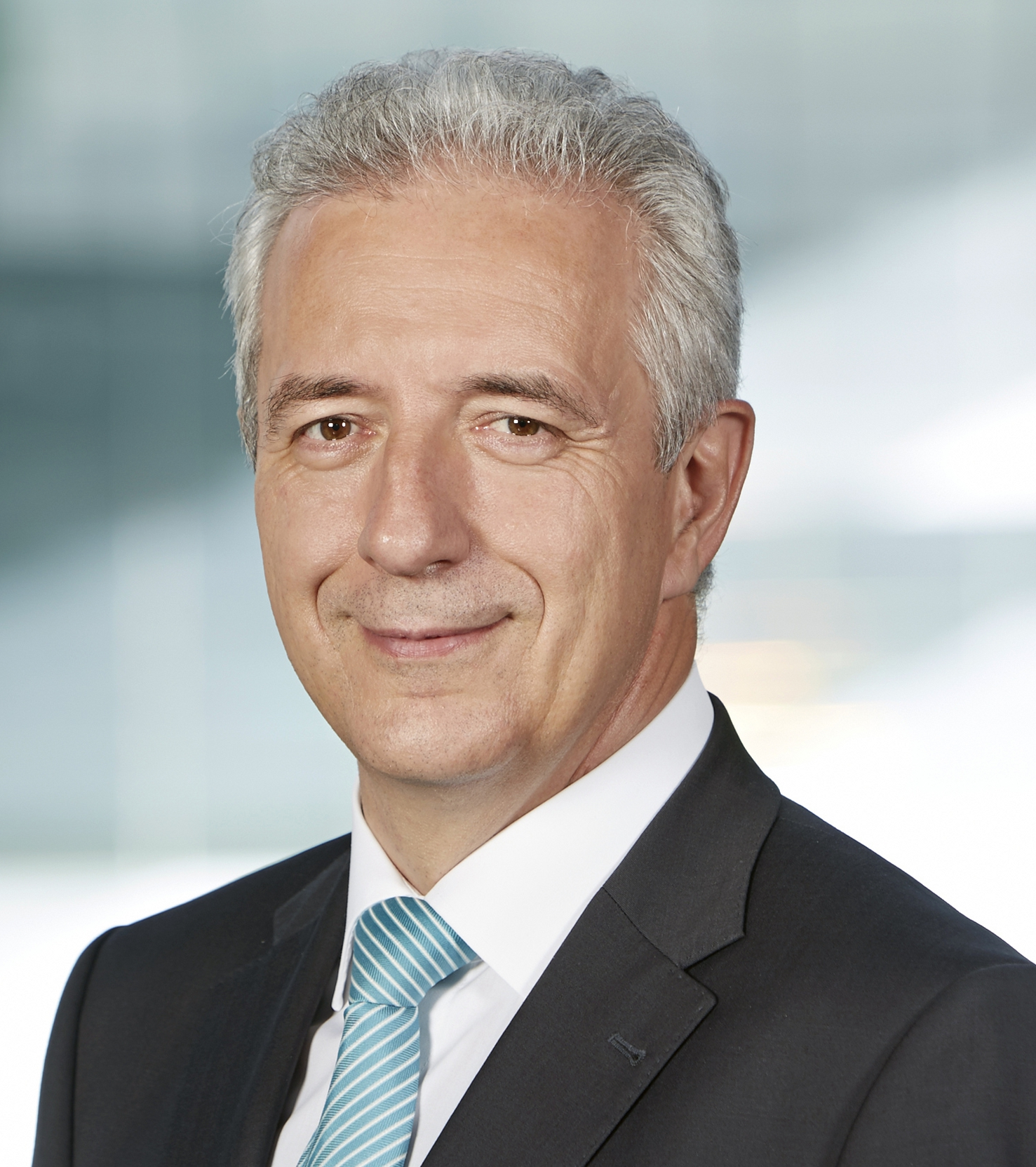
- Tillich in 2014

Chair of the Kohlekommission
- In office 6 June 2018 – 23 January 2019 Serving with Matthias Platzeck, Ronald Pofalla, Barbara Praetorius
- Preceded by: Position established
- Succeeded by: Position abolished

Minister-President of Saxony
- In office 28 May 2008 – 12 December 2017
- Deputy: Thomas Jurk; Sven Morlok; Martin Dulig
- Preceded by: Georg Milbradt
- Succeeded by: Michael Kretschmer

President of the Bundesrat
- In office 1 November 2015 – 31 October 2016
- First Vice President: Volker Bouffier
- Preceded by: Volker Bouffier
- Succeeded by: Malu Dreyer
Saxony State Minister
State Minister of Finances
In office 28 September 2007 – 18 June 2008
Minister-President	Georg Milbradt
Preceded by	Horst Metz
Succeeded by	Georg Unland
State Minister of Agriculture and the Environment
In office 11 November 2004 – 27 September 2007
Minister-President	Georg Milbradt
Preceded by	Steffen Flath
Succeeded by	Roland Wöller
State Minister and Chief of the State Chancellery
In office 2 May 2002 – 11 November 2004
Minister-President	Georg Milbradt
Preceded by	Georg Brüggen
Succeeded by	Hermann Winkler
State Minister Federal and European Affairs
In office 27 October 1999 – 2 May 2002
Minister-President	Kurt Biedenkopf
Preceded by	Günter Ermisch (1996)
Succeeded by	Thomas de Maizière (as State Minister of Justice)
Parliamentary constituencies
Member of the Landtag of Saxony for Bautzen 3 (Kamenz 2; 2004–2014)
In office 19 October 2004 – 31 October 2018
Preceded by	Constituency established
Succeeded by	Jörg Markert
Member of the European Parliament for Saxony
In office 19 July 1994 – 26 October 1999
Preceded by	multi-member district
Succeeded by	Brigitte Wenzel-Perillo
Member of the Volkskammer for Dresden
In office 5 April 1990 – 2 October 1990
Preceded by	Constituency established
Succeeded by	Constituency abolished

Personal details
- Born: Stanislaw Rudi Tillich; 10 April 1959 (age 67) Räckelwitz–Neudörfel, Saxony, East Germany
- Party: Christian Democratic Union
- Children: 2
- Education: TU Dresden
- Website: stanislaw-tillich.de

Stanislaw Rudi Tillich (German pronunciation: [ˈstanɪslaf ˈtɪlɪç]; Upper Sorbian: Stanisław Tilich, pronounced [ˈstanʲiswaf ˈtʲilʲix]; born 10 April 1959) is a Sorbian-German politician of the Christian Democratic Union (CDU). He served as the 3rd Minister President of Saxony from 2008 to 2017. From 1 November 2015 until 31 October 2016, he was President of the Bundesrat and ex officio deputy to the President of Germany. Tillich is of Sorbian ethnicity and lives in Panschwitz-Kuckau (Pančicy-Kukow), which is 35 kilometres north-east of Dresden near Kamenz.

== Early life and education ==
Born in Neudörfel (Sorbian: Nowa Wjeska) near Kamenz (Sorbian: Kamjenc), Tillich studied construction and drive techniques at the Dresden University of Technology after finishing his Abitur at the Sorbian Gymnasium in Bautzen in 1977. He graduated from university with a Diplomingenieur degree in 1984. Tillich was an employee of the district administration of Kamenz between 1987 and 1989. Later he became an entrepreneur.

== Political career ==
=== Early beginnings ===
Tillich joined the Christian Democratic Union (East Germany) in 1987 and became a member of the CDU after German reunification in 1990. He was a member of the Volkskammer in 1990.

Tillich was delegated as an observer of the European Parliament between 1991 and 1994. He joined the European People's Party and was a member of the European Parliament between 1994 and 1999 where he was the Parliament's rapporteur on the 1998 EU budget.

=== Career in state politics ===
Tillich was a minister in the government of Saxony from 1999. He was State Minister for Federal and European Affairs until 2002 when he became State Minister and head of the Staatskanzlei. In 2004 he was first elected a member of the Landtag of Saxony and became the Saxon State Minister for Environment and Agriculture. He became State Minister of Finance in 2007.

=== Minister-President of Saxony, 2008-2017 ===
Tillich was proposed by Georg Milbradt on 14 April 2008 to become his successor as the Minister-President of Saxony. The Landtag of Saxony elected him on 28 May 2008. He is the first Sorbian head of government in more than thousand years of Sorbian-German coexistence in Saxony.

Together with Günther Oettinger, Dieter Althaus, Maria Böhmer, Peter Hintze, Martina Krogmann and Peter Müller, Tillich co-chaired the CDU’s 2008 national convention in Stuttgart.

In the negotiations to form a coalition government of the Christian Democrats (CDU together with the Bavarian CSU) and the Free Democratic Party (FDP) following the 2009 national elections, Tillich was part of the CDU/CSU delegation in the working group on economic affairs and energy policy, led by Karl-Theodor zu Guttenberg and Rainer Brüderle.

In 2010, news media reported that Michael Kretschmer, the CDU’s general secretary in Saxony, had offered personal meetings with Tillich in exchange for party donations worth €500 to €8,000, or about $680 to $10,900.

From 2010, Tillich was a member of the Christian Democratic Union's 20-strong executive board. By 2012, opinion polls put the backing of Tillich's CDU at 44 percent, at the time the highest level of support in any of the 16 German federal states; this made commentators describe him as “Germany’s second most-powerful politician from the formerly Communist East“ after Chancellor Angela Merkel.

Tillich participated in the exploratory talks between the CDU, CSU and SPD parties to form a coalition government under Merkel following the 2013 federal elections.

Tillich won reelection in the 2014 state elections. Ahead of the elections, he had soon put an end to speculation that he might team up with the newly founded AfD, which the CDU instead attempted to characterize as a fringe movement that flirts with the far right. At the time, Saxony was the first of three eastern regions to hold elections in a two-week span, with Brandenburg and Thuringia later rounding off the first set of electoral since Merkel won a third term.

As one of Saxony's representatives at the Bundesrat, Tillich served as chairman of the Committee on Foreign Affairs from October 2016. In addition, he was a member of the German-Russian Friendship Group set up in cooperation with Russia's Federation Council.

When the AfD overtook the CDU for the first time to emerge as Saxony's most popular party in the 2017 national elections, Tillich resigned and Michael Kretschmer took over.

In 2017, Tillich said that the "People want Germany to stay Germany,".

== Life after politics ==
From 2018 until 2019, Tillich co-chaired the German government's so-called coal commission, which was tasked to develop a masterplan before the end of the year on how to phase-out coal and create a new economic perspective for the country's coal-mining regions.

Tillich was nominated by his party as delegate to the Federal Convention for the purpose of electing the President of Germany in 2022.

== Other activities ==
=== Corporate boards ===
- Mitteldeutsche Braunkohlengesellschaft (MIBRAG), chairman of the supervisory board (since 2019)
- Volga-Dnepr Airlines, Advisor (since 2019)

=== Non-profit organizations ===
- ZDF, deputy chairman of the board of directors
- Committee for the preparation of the Reformation anniversary 2017, ex officio member of the board of trustees (-2017)
- Leipzig 2015 – 1000th anniversary, member of the board of trustees
- Endowment for Culture of the Free State of Saxony (KdFS), ex officio chairman of the board of trustees (-2017)
- Frauenkirche Dresden Foundation, ex officio member of the board of trustees (-2017)
- Deutsches Museum, member of the board of trustees
- Development and Peace Foundation (SEF), deputy chairman of the board of trustees
- German Children and Youth Foundation (DKJS), member of the board of trustees
- Max Planck Society, member of the senate
- Peace of Westphalia Prize, member of the jury
- Rotary International, member

== Personal life ==
Besides his native language Upper Sorbian, Tillich speaks fluent German, Czech and Polish. His wife, Veronika, is half-Polish, half-Sorbian. Her father was a forced laborer from Poland who settled in Lusatia after World War II and married a Sorbian woman. Tillich and his wife have two children.
