= Saxony Landtag elections in the Weimar Republic =

German state elections

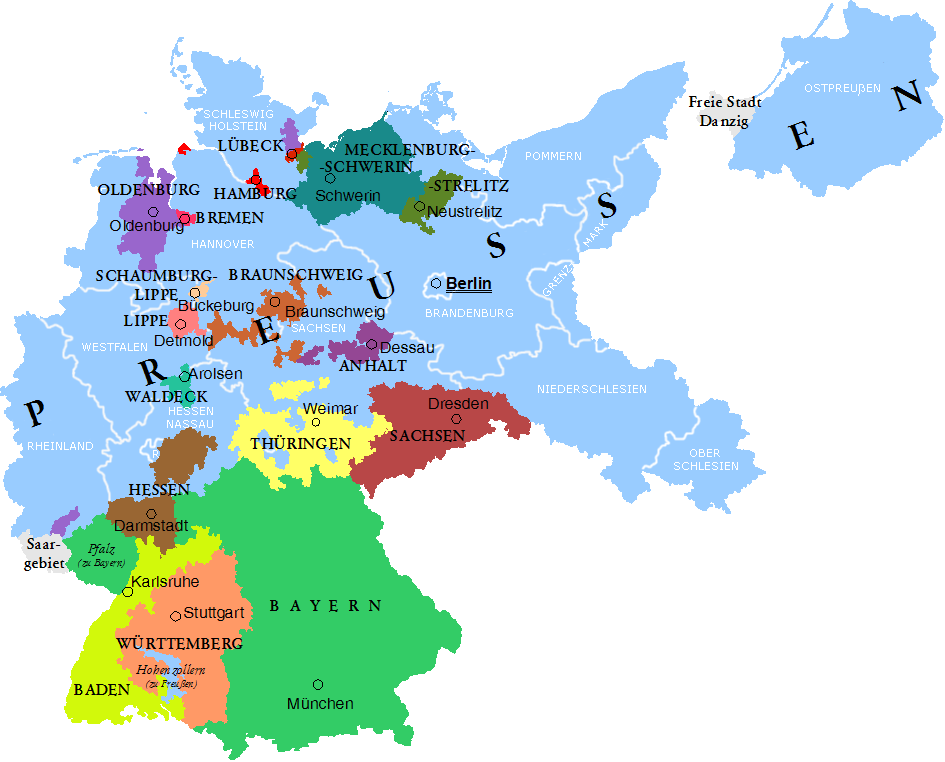
Saxony in the Weimar Republic. In the center in maroon

Landtag elections in the Free State of Saxony (Freistaat Sachsen) during the Weimar Republic were held at irregular intervals between 1919 and 1930. Results with regard to the percentage of the vote won and the number of seats allocated to each party are presented in the tables below. On 31 March 1933, the sitting Landtag was dissolved by the Nazi-controlled central government and reconstituted to reflect the distribution of seats in the national Reichstag. The Landtag subsequently was formally abolished as a result of the "Law on the Reconstruction of the Reich" of 30 January 1934 which replaced the German federal system with a unitary state.

== 1919 ==
The 1919 Saxony state election was held on 2 February 1919 to elect 97 members of the Volkskammer (People's Chamber).

1919 Saxon Volkskammer Election
Party	Votes	%	Seats
Social Democratic Party of Germany	891,804	41.56	42
German Democratic Party	490,666	22.87	22
Independent Social Democratic Party of Germany	350,069	16.31	15
German National People's Party	306,718	14.29	13
German People's Party	84,615	3.94	4
Christian People's Party	21,823	1.02	1
Total	2,145,695	100.00	97
Valid votes	2,145,695	99.76	
Invalid/blank votes	5,056	0.24	
Total votes	2,150,751	100.00	
Registered voters/turnout	2,889,573	74.43	
Source: Elections in the Weimar Republic, Elections in Germany

== 1920 ==
The 1920 Saxony state election was held on 14 November 1920 to the elect 96 members of the Landtag.

1920 Saxon Landtag Election
Party	Votes	%	Seats	+/–
Social Democratic Party of Germany	586,844	28.34	27	–15
German National People's Party	433,936	20.96	20	+7
German People's Party	385,524	18.62	18	+14
Independent Social Democratic Party of Germany (Right)	286,835	13.85	13	New
German Democratic Party	159,709	7.71	8	–14
Communist Party of Germany	117,280	5.66	6	New
Independent Social Democratic Party of Germany (Left)	60,108	2.90	3	New
Centre Party	22,731	1.10	1	New
Economic Union	17,723	0.86	0	New
Total	2,070,690	100.00	96	–1
Valid votes	2,070,690	99.57		
Invalid/blank votes	8,873	0.43		
Total votes	2,079,563	100.00		
Registered voters/turnout	2,955,212	70.37		
Source: Elections in the Weimar Republic, Elections in Germany

== 1922 ==
The 1922 Saxony state election was held on 5 November 1922 to the elect 96 members of the Landtag.

1922 Saxon Landtag Election
Party	Votes	%	Seats	+/–
Social Democratic Party of Germany	1,060,247	41.78	40	+13
German National People's Party	482,469	19.01	19	–1
German People's Party	474,708	18.71	19	+1
Communist Party of Germany	266,864	10.52	10	+4
German Democratic Party	214,189	8.44	8	0
Centre Party	22,611	0.89	0	–1
German Social People's Community	11,358	0.45	0	New
Reich Party of the German Middle Class	5,137	0.20	0	New
Total	2,537,583	100.00	96	0
Valid votes	2,537,583	99.51		
Invalid/blank votes	12,385	0.49		
Total votes	2,549,968	100.00		
Registered voters/turnout	3,117,487	81.80		
Source: Elections in the Weimar Republic, Elections in Germany

== 1926 ==
The 1926 Saxony state election was held on 31 October 1926 to the elect 96 members of the Landtag.

1926 Saxon Landtag Elections
Party	Votes	%	Seats	+/–
Social Democratic Party of Germany	758,005	32.14	31	–9
Communist Party of Germany	342,382	14.52	14	+4
German National People's Party	341,153	14.47	14	–5
German People's Party	292,085	12.39	12	–7
Reich Party of the German Middle Class	237,626	10.08	10	+10
German Democratic Party	111,467	4.73	5	–3
Reich Party for Civil Rights and Deflation	98,479	4.18	4	New
Old Social Democratic Party of Germany	97,885	4.15	4	New
National Socialist Freedom Movement	37,725	1.60	2	New
Centre Party	24,089	1.02	0	0
Völkisch Social Working Community	10,356	0.44	0	New
Reich Association of House and Land Owner Societies	7,011	0.30	0	New
Total	2,358,263	100.00	96	0
Valid votes	2,358,263	98.98		
Invalid/blank votes	24,191	1.02		
Total votes	2,382,454	100.00		
Registered voters/turnout	3,353,079	71.05		
Source: Elections in the Weimar Republic, Elections in Germany

== 1929 ==
The 1929 Saxony state election was held on 12 May 1929 to the elect 96 members of the Landtag.

1929 Saxon Landtag Elections
Party	Votes	%	Seats	+/–
Social Democratic Party of Germany	922,932	34.16	33	+2
German People's Party	363,382	13.45	13	+1
Communist Party of Germany	345,530	12.79	12	–2
Reich Party of the German Middle Class	304,884	11.28	11	+1
German National People's Party	218,309	8.08	8	–6
Saxon Peasants	140,611	5.20	5	New
Nazi Party	133,958	4.96	5	New
German Democratic Party	115,289	4.27	4	–1
Reich Party for Civil Rights and Deflation	70,131	2.60	3	–1
Old Social Democratic Party of Germany	39,568	1.46	2	–2
Centre Party	25,460	0.94	0	0
Communist Party of Germany (Opposition)	22,129	0.82	0	New
Total	2,702,183	100.00	96	0
Valid votes	2,702,183	99.07		
Invalid/blank votes	25,488	0.93		
Total votes	2,727,671	100.00		
Registered voters/turnout	3,478,968	78.40		
Source: Elections in the Weimar Republic, Elections in Germany

== 1930 ==
The 1930 Saxony state election was held on 22 June 1930 to the elect 96 members of the Landtag.

1930 Saxon Landtag Elections
Party	Votes	%	Seats	+/–
Social Democratic Party of Germany	871,114	33.37	32	–1
Nazi Party	376,769	14.43	14	+9
Communist Party of Germany	355,381	13.61	13	+1
Reich Party of the German Middle Class	276,674	10.60	10	–1
German People's Party	227,329	8.71	8	–5
German National People's Party	124,261	4.76	5	–3
Saxon Peasants	120,391	4.61	5	0
German Democratic Party	83,745	3.21	3	–1
Christian Social People's Service	57,428	2.20	2	New
Reich Party for Civil Rights and Deflation	44,228	1.69	2	–1
People's National Reich Association	39,358	1.51	2	New
Old Social Democratic Party of Germany	19,206	0.74	0	–2
Communist Party of Germany (Opposition)	14,719	0.56	0	0
Total	2,610,603	100.00	96	0
Valid votes	2,610,603	99.00		
Invalid/blank votes	26,324	1.00		
Total votes	2,636,927	100.00		
Registered voters/turnout	3,580,541	73.65		
Source: Elections in the Weimar Republic, Elections in Germany
