= Landtag of Saxony =

State legislature in Germany

Coordinates: 51°03′24″N 13°43′59″E

Landtag of the Free State of Saxony Sächsischer Landtag Sakski krajny sejm
- 8th Landtag of Saxony

- Flag of the Landtag of Saxony
- Established: 3 October 1990

Leadership
- President of the Landtag: Alexander Dierks, CDU; 1 October 2024
- First Vice President: Ines Saborowski, CDU; 1 October 2024
- Second Vice President: André Wendt, AfD; 1 October 2024

Structure
- Seats: 120
- Political groups: Government (51) CDU (41) SPD (10) Opposition (69) AfD (40) BSW (14) Greens (7) The Left (6) Independent (2)

Elections
- Voting system: Mixed-member proportional representation (MMP)
- Last election: 1 September 2024
- Next election: 2029

Meeting place
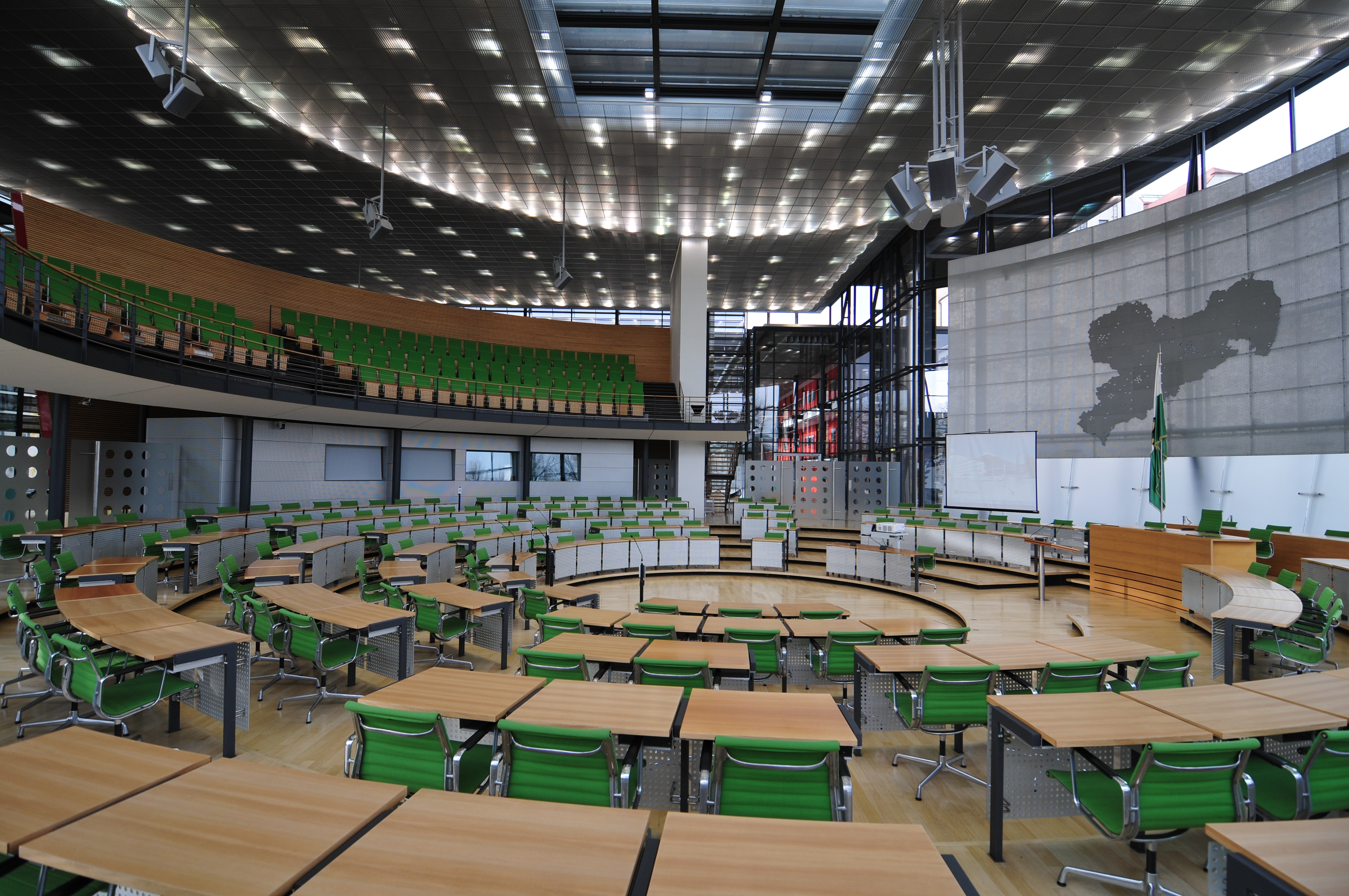
- Saxon Landtag (building)

Website
- www.landtag.sachsen.de/de

The Landtag of Saxony (German: Sächsischer Landtag; Upper Sorbian: Sakski krajny sejm), also known in English as the Saxon State Parliament, is the legislature of the Free State of Saxony, one of Germany's sixteen states. It is responsible for legislation, control of the government, and electing some state officials. The Landtag has existed in various forms since 1831, but the current body was established during German reunification in 1990. The Landtag is directly elected and has a term of five years.

== Powers ==
As the legislative body of the Free State of Saxony, the Landtag is responsible for drafting and passing laws, including the state budget, as well as overseeing the activities of the state government and electing the Minister-President, the head of government.

Draft laws may be introduced to the Landtag in various ways: by the proposal of at least six members, by any parliamentary group, by the state government, or by public petition. Draft laws are first sent by the President of the Landtag to a relevant committee, which considers the draft law and makes any amendments it considers necessary. The committee then submits a report to the Landtag recommending either its adoption or its rejection. The Landtag then debates and votes on the law. If it is adopted, it is submitted to the Minister-President and the relevant state minister for countersigning. It is then promulgated by the state government and enters into force.

As Saxony has a parliamentary system, the state government is reliant on the confidence of the Landtag in order to serve. The Landtag is thus responsible for oversight of the government. The state constitution declares that the Landtag has a comprehensive right to question the government, who must respond to inquiries from parliamentary groups or individual Landtag members. Parliamentary groups may request debates on issues of relevance in the plenary, at which the state government is obliged to speak. Standing committees may also demand the presence of members of the state government to give statements.

The first responsibility of the Landtag during each legislative period is the election of its presiding officer, the President of the Landtag, as well as the Vice-Presidents of the Landtag. The Landtag also elects the head of the state government, the Minister-President. The Minister-President must win an absolute majority of votes to be elected in the first round of voting; if no candidate achieves this, a simple majority suffices in further rounds. The Minister-President is then responsible for the appointment of the state cabinet. The Landtag also elects a number of other state offices, including the Commissioner for Data Protection, the Commissioner for Coming to Terms with the SED Dictatorship (German: Aufarbeitung der SED-Diktatur), the Commissioner for Foreigners, the President of the Saxon Court of Auditors, and the members of the Saxon Constitutional Court.

== History ==
Some form of an assembly has existed in the state's predecessors since the Saxon House of Wettin was enfeoffed with the Margraviate of Meissen in 1089. The local ministeriales regularly met with the Wettin margraves, consulting but also defending the interests of their own region. By the time Meissen was elevated to the Electorate of Saxony by the Golden Bull of 1356, the noble representatives of the estates formed a permanent advisory board. With the deputies of the Saxon cities, these Landstände councils gradually obtained a considerable voice until the 15th century: mainly in fiscal and military policies, later also in religious matters concerning the Protestant Reformation.

=== Kingdom of Saxony ===
A modern-style bicameral constitutionally-based legislature was introduced in the Kingdom of Saxony in September 1831. In the wake of the tumultuous 1848 revolutions, Saxony's Landtag extended voting rights (though still maintaining property requirements) and abolished poll taxes. In 1871, Saxony was incorporated into the German Empire, and more voting rights were gradually extended.

Upon the introduction of universal male suffrage in 1909, the number of eligible voters almost tripled – from 264,000 in 1907 to 773,000 – and turnout increased dramatically (from 48% to 82%). The influx of previously disenfranchised working-class voters allowed the Social Democratic Party (SPD) to win substantial representation for the first time since the 1890s, splitting the hitherto stable National Liberal/Conservative party system.

=== Free State ===
After the First World War and the German Revolution of 1918–1919, Saxony was re-established as a republic, adopting its modern title of "Free State". During the Weimar Republic period, Saxon politics were dominated by the Social Democratic Party (SPD), with the German National People's Party (DNVP), the Communist Party (KPD), the German People's Party (DVP), and later the Economic Party (WP) maintaining a significant presence. From 1926 onward, a series of right-wing coalition governments were led successively by the small Old Social Democratic Party (ASPD), the DVP, and the DNVP. After the Nazi seizure of power in 1933, the government passed the "Law on the Reconstruction of the Reich" (30 January 1934) that abolished all the state Landtage.

The Landtag was de facto re-established in the Soviet occupation zone in 1946, later becoming part of the German Democratic Republic (East Germany). It functioned until its abolition in 1952, during which time it was dominated by the Socialist Unity Party (SED).

The Landtag was formally re-established again upon Germany's legal reunification on 3 October 1990. It was elected on 14 October, and its inaugural sitting took place on 27 October. Since 1990, the Christian Democratic Union (CDU) has always been the largest party; it held an absolute majority of seats until 2004.

== Constituencies ==
Map of constituencies used in the 2014 Landtag election

== Electoral system ==
Elections to the Landtag are conducted via mixed-member proportional representation using closed party lists. Voters have two votes: a "first vote" for a directly-elected representative from one of a number of single-member constituencies, and a "second vote" for a party list. In order to qualify for representation, a party must either gain 5% of the statewide list vote or win at least two constituencies. First-past-the-post voting is used for single-member constituencies, and the overall seat distribution is determined using the Saint-Laguë method.

In the case of overhang seats, the total number of seats in the Landtag is increased from the standard 120 (60 constituency seats and 60 party list seats) until no overhang seats remain, i.e. the number of leveling seats added is equal to the original number of overhang seats.

There is also a provision ensuring that, if a party wins an absolute majority of party votes but does not win an absolute majority of seats, an extra seat is awarded to that party at the expense of the other parties.

== Current composition ==
=== 2024 state election ===
Party	Party-list			Constituency			Total seats	+/–
Party	Votes	%	Seats	Votes	%	Seats	Total seats	+/–
Christian Democratic Union	749,114	31.90	14	805,257	34.43	27	41	▼3
Alternative for Germany	719,279	30.63	12	794,223	33.96	28	40	▲3
Sahra Wagenknecht Alliance	277,568	11.82	15	148,361	6.34	0	15	New
Social Democratic Party	172,021	7.33	10	144,425	6.18	0	10	▼1
Alliance 90/The Greens	119,980	5.11	5	119,033	5.09	2	7	▼6
The Left	104,891	4.47	4	149,124	6.38	2	6	▼8
Free Voters	53,027	2.26	0	113,062	4.83	1	1	▲1
Free Saxons	52,100	2.22	0	12,693	0.54	0	0	0
Action Party for Animal Welfare	23,606	1.01	0				0	0
Free Democratic Party	20,995	0.89	0	33,650	1.44	0	0	0
Die PARTEI	19,752	0.84	0	2,606	0.11	0	0	0
Pirate Party	6,772	0.29	0				0	0
Bündnis Deutschland	6,718	0.29	0	972	0.04	0	0	New
Values Union	6,474	0.28	0	1,818	0.08	0	0	New
Grassroots Democratic Party of Germany	4,486	0.19	0	702	0.03	0	0	New
Alliance C	4,370	0.19	0				0	0
V-Partei3	3,283	0.14	0				0	0
Ecological Democratic Party	1,955	0.08	0	321	0.01	0	0	0
Civil Rights Movement Solidarity	1,582	0.07	0	752	0.03	0	0	0
Team Zastrow				6,988	0.30	0	0	0
Solutions for our region				2,152	0.09	0	0	0
Party of Progress				249	0.01	0	0	0
We Are Leipzig				382	0.02	0	0	0
Independents				2,040	0.09	0	0	0
Total	2,347,973	100.00	60	2,338,810	100.00	60	120	–
Valid votes	2,347,973	99.17		2,338,810	98.78			
Invalid/blank votes	19,634	0.83		28,797	1.22			
Total votes	2,367,607	100.00		2,367,607	100.00			
Registered voters/turnout	3,182,683	74.39		3,182,683	74.39			
Source: wahlen.sachsen.de

== Historical composition ==
1st Landtag

2nd Landtag

3rd Landtag

4th Landtag

5th Landtag

6th Landtag

7th Landtag

=== Members of the state government ===
Government office	Photo	Name	Party	State secretaries
Minister President Staatskanzlei		Michael Kretschmer	CDU	Andreas Handschuh Head of the State Chancellery State Secretary for Federal and European Affairs
Deputy Minister President		Petra Köpping	SPD	
Minister of State for Social Affairs, Health and Social Cohesion		Petra Köpping	SPD	
Minister of State for the Interior		Armin Schuster	CDU	
Minister of State of Finance		Christian Piwarz	CDU	
Minister of State for the Environment and Agriculture		Georg-Ludwig von Breitenbuch	CDU	
Minister of State for Education		Conrad Clemens	CDU	
State Minister for Science		Sebastian Gemkow	CDU	
Minister of State for Culture and Tourism		Barbara Klepsch	CDU	
State Minister for Economic Affairs, Labor, Energy and Climate Protection		Dirk Panter	SPD	
Minister of State of Justice		Constanze Geiert	CDU	
Minister of State for Infrastructure and Regional Development		Regina Kraushaar	CDU	

== See also ==
- List of presidents of the Landtag of Saxony
