= Sächsische Staatskanzlei =

Coordinates: 51.057°N 13.749°E

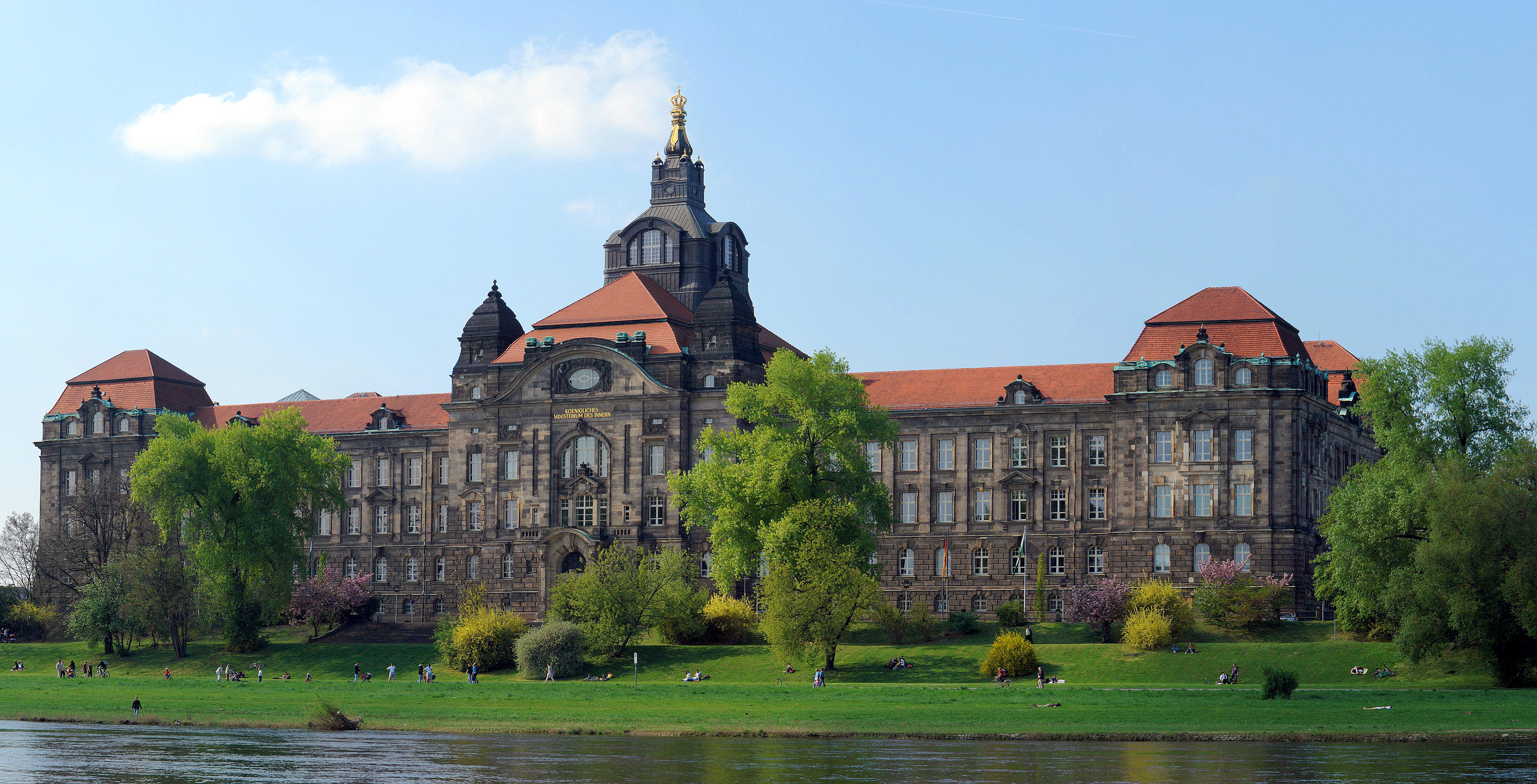
The Sächsische Staatskanzlei

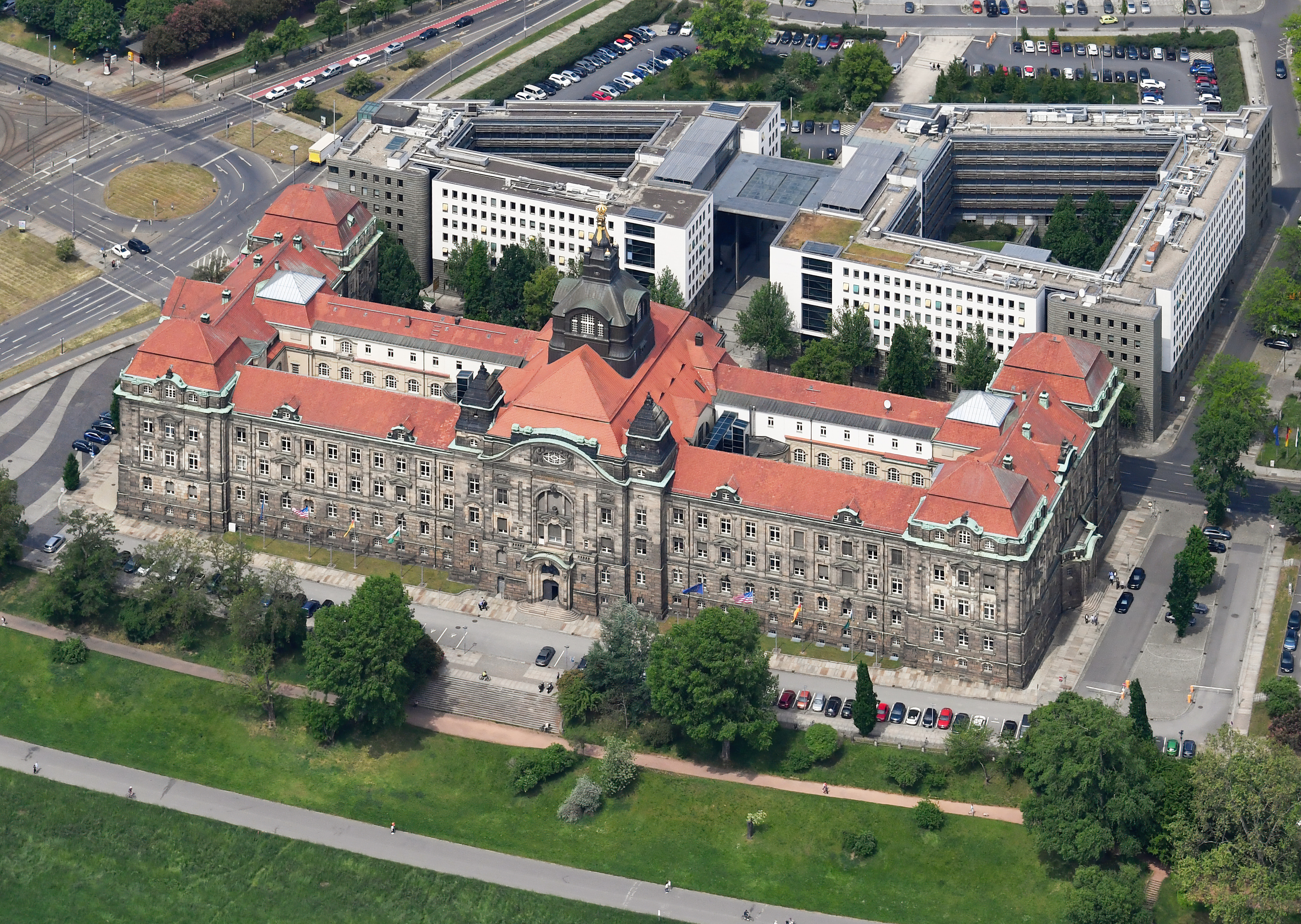
Aerial view of the Sächsische Staatskanzlei

The Sächsische Staatskanzlei (Saxon State Chancellery or Saxon State Chamber) is the office of the Minister-President of Saxony. It is in Dresden on the northern Elbe river banks and was established in 1995. The Staatskanzlei is managed by the State Minister and Head of the Staatskanzlei.

The Free State of Saxony also established a Staatskanzlei between 1918 and 1945. The building was used by the Rat des Bezirkes (Board of the Bezirk) of the Bezirk Dresden after the German Democratic Republic had established the Bezirk subdivisions in 1952.

== Building ==
The building of the Staatskanzlei is the Gemeinsames Ministerialgebäude or Gesamtministerium (Joint Ministry Building'). It was built between 1900 and 1904 in Historicistic style. The golden crown on the roof was a visible symbol of authority in the Kingdom of Saxony during the last years of the German Empire. The building is still lettered as Königliches Ministerium des Inneren (Royal Ministry of the Interior) today.

== Tasks ==
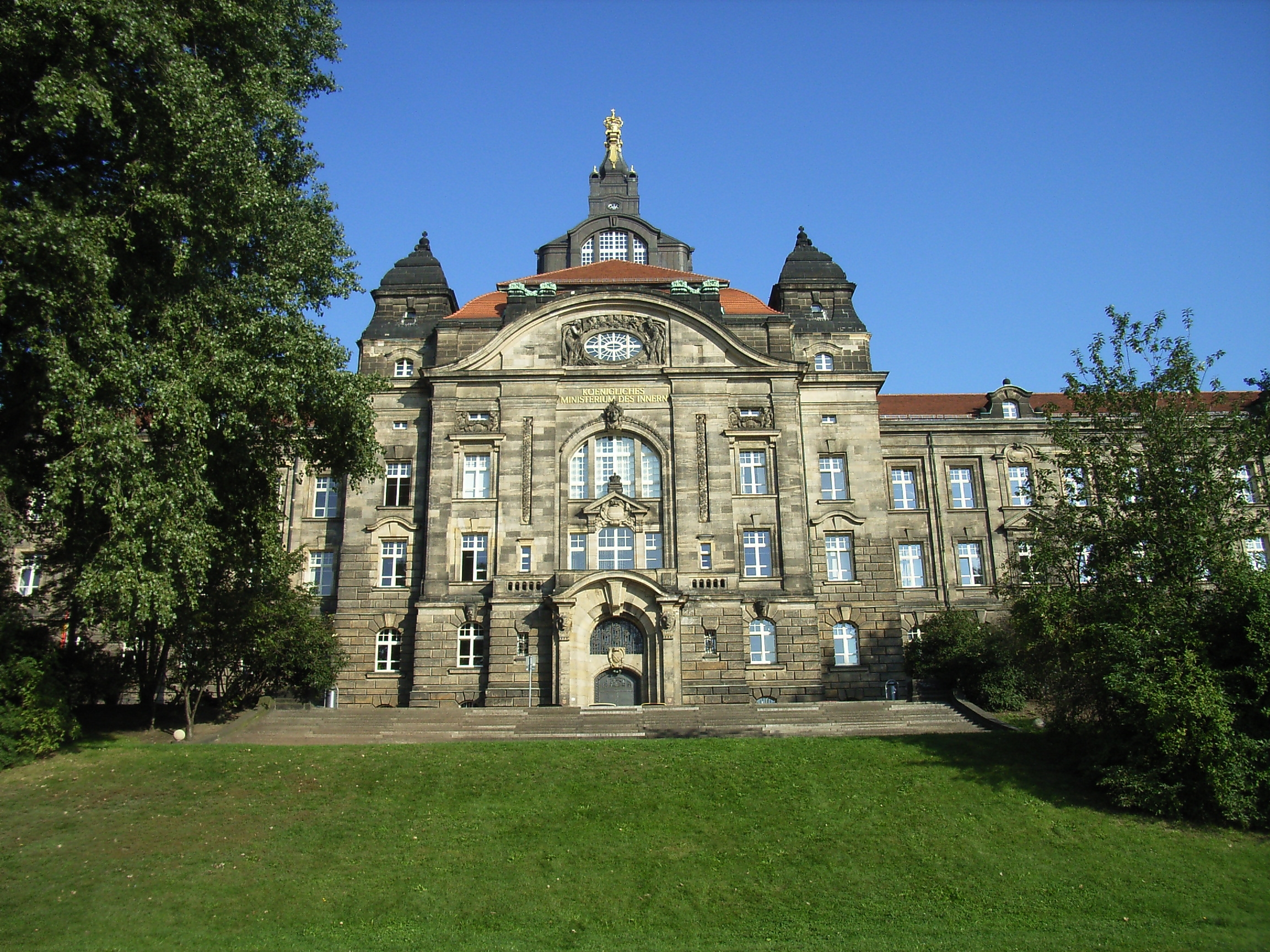
The gable of the central wing

- Supporting the Minister-President in politics
- Evaluation of passed laws concerning their constitutionality
- Questions of state area and state structuring
- Correspondence to the Landtag of Saxony
- Correspondence to the Federal Republic and the other 15 German states
- Coordination of the government's external affairs (involving Federal Republic, European Union and other states)
- Representation of Saxony with offices in Berlin and Brussels
- Coordination of the international relationships especially cross-border affairs with the proximate Poland and Czech Republic
- Petition for mercy (which address the Minister-President)
- Media politics
