= Michael Kretschmer =

German politician (born 1975)

Michael Kretschmer MdL MdBR
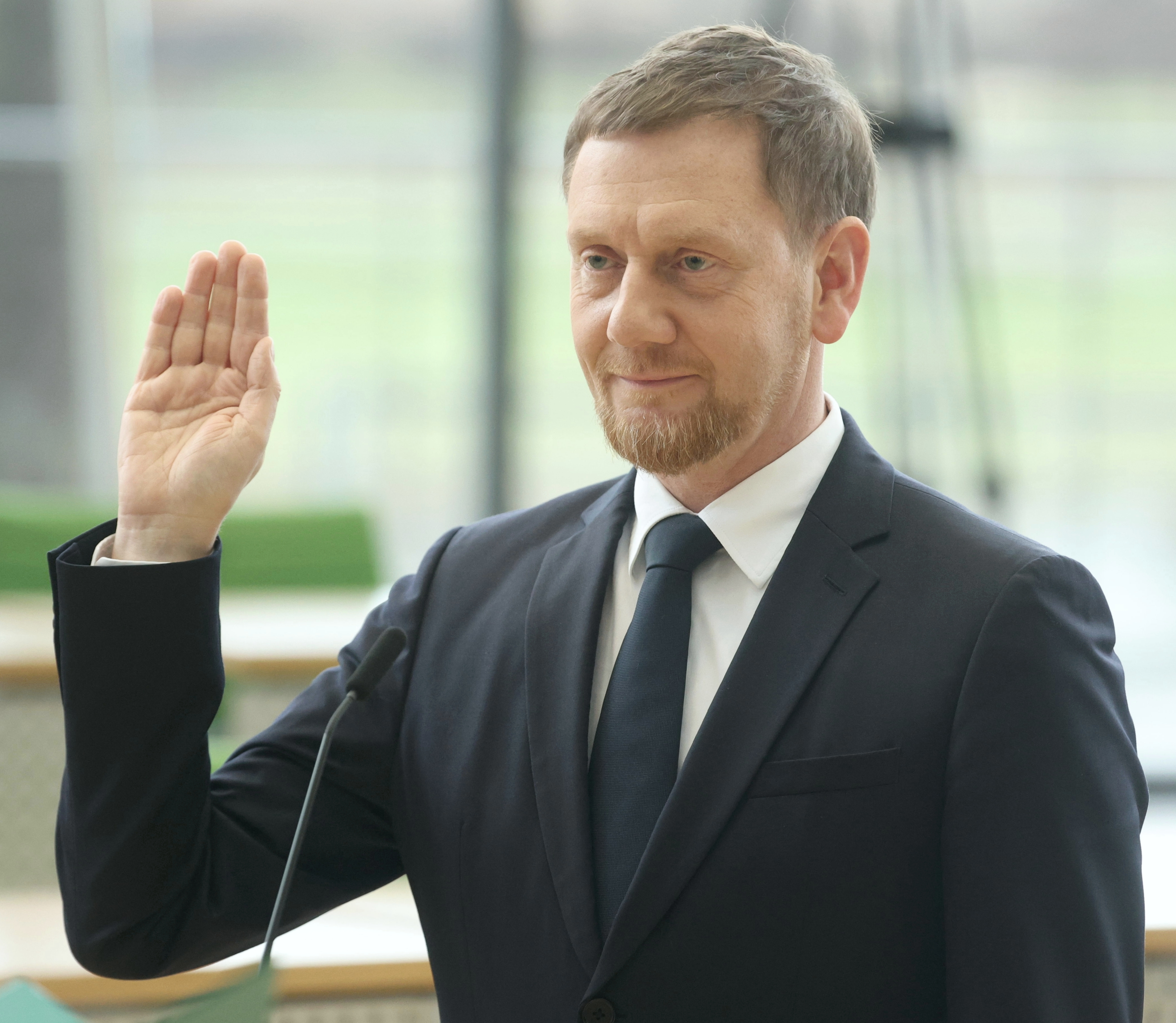
- Kretschmer in 2024

Deputy Leader of the Christian Democratic Union
- Incumbent
- Assumed office 31 January 2022 Serving with Silvia Breher, Andreas Jung, Carsten Linnemann, Karin Prien
- Leader: Friedrich Merz
- Preceded by: Volker Bouffier

Minister-President of Saxony
- Incumbent
- Assumed office 13 December 2017
- Deputy: Petra Köpping
- Preceded by: Stanislaw Tillich

Leader of CDU Saxony
- Incumbent
- Assumed office 9 December 2017
- General Secretary: Alexander Dierks
- Deputy: Barbara Klepsch; Christian Hartmann; Thomas Schmidt
- Preceded by: Stanislaw Tillich

General Secretary of the Christian Democratic Union of Saxony
- In office 1 December 2004 – 9 December 2017
- Leader: Georg Milbradt; Stanislaw Tillich
- Preceded by: Hermann Winkler
- Succeeded by: Alexander Dierks
Parliamentary constituencies
Member of the Landtag of Saxony for Görlitz 2
Incumbent
Assumed office 1 October 2019
Preceded by	Octavian Ursu
Member of the Bundestag for Görlitz (Löbau-Zittau – Görlitz – Niesky; 2002–2005)
In office 17 October 2002 – 24 October 2017
Preceded by	Georg Janovsky
Succeeded by	Tino Chrupalla

Personal details
- Born: Michael Kretschmer; 7 May 1975 (age 51) Görlitz, Bezirk Dresden, East Germany (now Germany)
- Party: Christian Democratic Union (since 1989)
- Spouse: Annett Hoffmann (m. 2020)
- Children: 2
- Education: Dresden University of Applied Sciences
- Website: michaelkretschmer.de

Michael Kretschmer (born 7 May 1975) is a German politician of the Christian Democratic Union (CDU) who has been serving as Minister President of Saxony since December 2017. Since 2022, he has been one of four deputy chairs of the CDU, under the leadership of chairman Friedrich Merz.

== Political career ==
=== Member of Parliament, 2002–2017 ===
From 2002 to 2017 Kretschmer was a member of the Bundestag as directly elected representative for Görlitz. He first served on the Committee on Education, Research and Technology Assessment. In the negotiations to form a coalition government under Chancellor Angela Merkel following the 2009 federal elections, he was a member of the working group on economic affairs and energy, led by Annette Schavan and Andreas Pinkwart.

From 2009 to 2017 Kretschmer was one of the vice chairs of the CDU/CSU parliamentary group, under the leadership of chairman Volker Kauder. During his time in parliament, he was also of the German-Russian Parliamentary Friendship Group and the German-Polish Parliamentary Friendship Group.

In the negotiations to form a Grand Coalition of Chancellor Angela Merkel's Christian Democrats (CDU together with the Bavarian CSU) and the SPD following the 2013 federal elections, Kretschmer led the CDU/CSU delegation in the working group on cultural and media affairs; his counterpart of the SPD was Klaus Wowereit. Over the following years, he co-chaired the CDU's national conventions in Karlsruhe (2015), Essen (2016) and Berlin (2018).

Kretschmer lost reelection in 2017 to Tino Chrupalla of the AfD.

=== Minister-President of Saxony, 2017–present ===
On 18 October 2017, Stanislaw Tillich announced his resignation as Minister President of Saxony and suggested that Kretschmer should replace him. He is only the fourth and also the youngest person to hold that office.

As one of Saxony's representatives at the Bundesrat, Kretschmer has been serving as member of the Committee on Foreign Affairs since 2017. In addition, he is a member of the German-Russian Friendship Group set up in cooperation with Russia's Federation Council.

In the negotiations to form a fourth cabinet under Merkel following the 2017 federal elections, Kretschmer co-chaired the working group on transport and infrastructure, alongside Alexander Dobrindt and Sören Bartol.

In December 2021, ZDF journalists discovered a plot by anti-vaccine and anti-lockdown extremists to assassinate Kretschmer, which led to an investigation by Saxon police and searchings for weapons through several houses in Dresden.

Since 2022, Kretschmer, alongside Karl-Josef Laumann, has been chairing a working group in charge of drafting policies on social security for the CDU's new party platform.

He was re-elected following the 2024 Saxony state election.

== Other activities ==
- Association of German Foundations, member of the Parliamentary Advisory Board
- Development and Peace Foundation (SEF), deputy chairman of the board of trustees
- Deutsches Museum, Member of the Board of Trustees
- Dresden Frauenkirche, ex officio member of the board of trustees
- Helmholtz Association of German Research Centres, member of the senate
- Max Planck Society, Member of the Senate
- Max Planck Institute for Chemical Physics of Solids, Member of the Board of Trustees
- Max Planck Institute for the Physics of Complex Systems, Member of the Board of Trustees
- Senckenberg Nature Research Society, Member of the Board of Trustees
- Evangelisches Studienwerk Villigst, member of the board of trustees (2009–2013)
- Federal Agency for Civic Education, member of the board of trustees (2002–2005)

== Political positions ==
In June 2017, Kretschmer voted against Germany's introduction of same-sex marriage.

In June 2019, Kretschmer called for the lifting of EU sanctions against Russia. This was immediately rejected by CDU chairwoman Annegret Kramp-Karrenbauer. Later that year, Kretschmer met with Russian president Vladimir Putin at the St. Petersburg International Economic Forum.

He was opposed to restrictions during the beginning of the COVID-19 pandemic and even attended an anti-lockdown demonstration, but changed his mind and apologised in December 2020. In November 2021 he disagreed with Federal Minister of Health Jens Spahn on ending the nationwide state of emergency.

During the Russo-Ukrainian war in November 2025 Kretschmer stated, that after a ceasefire, Russian energy should be imported again by Germany. This caused backlash from CDU and SPD delegates alike.

== Controversy ==
During his tenure as secretary general of the CDU in Saxony, Kretschmer faced criticism after reports surfaced in 2010 that personal meetings with party chairman and Minister-President Stanislaw Tillich were offered to potential corporate sponsors in exchange for donations.
