= Walter Priesnitz =

German lawyer

- Born: 1 April 1932; Hindenburg, Upper Silesia, Germany
- Died: 26 August 2012 (aged 80); Neuharlingersiel ( Wittmund), Lower Saxony, Germany
- Education: Free University of Berlin; Münster; Cologne
- Occupations: Banker; Regional administrator Government lawyer Senior government officer Secretary of state
- Known for: heading up "Häftlingsfreikauf" negotiations
- Political party: CDU
- Spouse(s): 1. ____ ____; 2. Ursula ____
- Children: 2

Walter Priesnitz (1 April 1932 – 26 August 2012) was a German lawyer and government legal officer. He played a central role in negotiating the Trading of East German political prisoners for – in most cases – cash ("Häftlingsfreikauf") on behalf of the West German government, an informal and (at least initially) highly secret operation that was in place between 1962 and 1989. An obituary published by the "17 June 1953 Association" (Note: The "Vereinigung 17. Juni 1953" ("17 June 1953 Association") is a non-profit organisation committed to protecting victims of the one-party dictatorship that was East Germany between 1949 and 1989.) described Priesnitz as "a pioneer of humanity above and below the barbed wire that so bitterly and inhumanly divided our country during [four] decades." (Note: "... einen Wegbereiter der Humanität über und unter dem Stacheldraht hinweg, der unser Land so unerbittlich und inhuman über Jahrzehnte teilte".)

== Life and works ==
=== Provenance and early years ===
Walter Priesnitz was born into a catholic family in Hindenburg (as Zabrze was known between 1915 and 1944), near Katowice in Upper Silesia. The region had been part of Prussia/Germany since 1740 but the narrow result of the March 1921 referendum had done nothing to still the ethnic tensions that had been intensifying ever since the middle part of the nineteenth century. Within this ever more polarising society, Priesnitz grew up as a member of the ethnic German community. His father worked in a bank. He attended school in nearby Gleiwitz until 1945 when he was removed from school and conscripted into the newly formed "Volksturn" (people's militia). Shortly after this he found himself taken as a prisoner of war to Prague. His period of detention lasted only a few weeks, however. By the end of the year he was back at school, now in Zwickau, where in 1950 he passed his "Abitur" (school final exams). It is likely that he was among the millions driven west by the ethnic cleansing of 1945 which had seen the German population of Silesia forcibly replaced by ethnic Poles, themselves driven out of the larger (but less densely populated) area which before 1939 had been internationally recognised as the eastern third of Poland. During 1950/51 Priesnitz undertook an apprenticeship with the Zwickauer Kreissparkasse (regional bank).

=== Further education ===
Instead of following his father into a banking career, Priesnitz now spent the next four years obtaining a university-level education, studying Jurisprudence and Volkswirtschaft (applied economics) at Berlin (Free University), Münster and Cologne. While still an undergraduate student, in 1954, Walter Priesnitz joined the centre-right CDU (political party). He also became a life-long member of the catholic student fraternity "K.St.V. Borussia-Königsberg zu Köln". He passed his level 1 and level 2 national law exams respectively in 1955 and 1959 while working as a pre-qualification lawyer. He received his doctorate in 1960/61 from the University of Cologne in return for a piece of work on "the motives for robbery of young law breakers". The dissertation was based on a study of Cologne district court records covering the period 1953–1956 in respect of convicted lawbreakers.

=== Government service ===
Walter Priesnitz had by now switched to government service, employed successively between 1959 and 1971 at two government ministries. He started out at the West German Federal Ministry of Displaced Persons, Refugees and War Victims (as it was then known), working until 1962 in an administrative capacity for Department IV, which was the department responsible for disability insurance. In 1961 he was promoted to the "departmental assistant" grade. After that there came a mandatory period of working "in the field" during which he undertook three relatively brief stints at the Berlin Social Security office, at the National Supervisory Office for the Banking System (also in Berlin), and thirdly for the Eiderstedt District Council, in the extreme north of the country, near the border with Denmark. By the end of 1963 he was back at the ministry, where he served as a section head until 1967. He then took charge, during 1968/69, of the ministry's important "Representation Office" in West Berlin. (West German government ministries were based in Bonn until 1990.) In 1969 there was a change of government and Priesnitz was switched to the Interior Ministry, where between 1969 and 1971 he served as departmental director of the department in charge of the endlessly complex relationship between West Germany and Germany's divided former capital which still, before 1972, had no internationally agreed status.

=== Regional government ===
On 1 March 1971 Priesnitz moved on to a senior post as director of regional administration ("Kreisverwaltungsdirektor") for Nordfriesland, which involved a return to the region of West Germany bordering Denmark. He remained in post until 1975, evidently cementing his reputation for exceptional competence. Although the position was not a directly political one, it involved extensive work at the critical interface between politicians and the world of public administration. His next posting was to Ahlen, a prosperous mid-sized municipality slightly to the east of the Ruhr industrial region. Here he served between 1975 and 1985 as "Stadtdirektor" – effectively chief executive of city administration. During this time he worked closely on a succession of important projects with Benedikt Ruhmöller who was later, in 1999, elected mayor of Ahlen. Paying tribute to his former boss in 2012, Ruhmöller recalled Priesnitz as a "person valued on all sides, and an exceptionally competent administrator". (Note: "Mit Dr. Walter Priesnitz verlieren wir einen allseits geschätzten Menschen und höchst kompetenten Verwaltungsexperten.")

=== Intra-German relations ===
Priesnitz was called back to Bonn in 1985, taking a position with the "Bundesministerium für innerdeutsche Beziehungen" ("Ministry for Intra-German Relations") as head of Department II, described in one source as the ministry department responsible for "Germany Policy" and "humanitarian tasks". In 1986 he took charge in another department of the ministry, Department Z, in which responsibilities covered "administration and humanitarian tasks" [again], along with "structural and funding measures".

In 1988 he took over from Ludwig A. Rehlinger as departmental Secretary of state. (Note: Under English convention, the term "Secretary of State" is applied to a politician – generally a government minister. Under the German constitution a "Secretary of State" ("Beamtete Staatssekretäre") is a senior government official. The political affiliation of the office holder – where he/she has one – is generally known and may very well be deemed significant, but the office holder is not him/herself a politician.) Although he held the office for only a little more than two years, the period was an exceptional one. The German Democratic Republic (East Germany) was changing rapidly, in ways that few western commentators noticed at the time. The country was, by many criteria, financially bankrupt. The Soviet Union was modernising economically: East German trade negotiators visiting potential overseas customers for the (lucrative) heavy industrial plant and machinery in which the country traditionally specialised were increasingly coming across their Soviet counterparts not as comradely socialist partners, but as commercial competitors. Morally, too, the winds of Glasnost blowing across from – of all places – Moscow left the party leadership facing an ever more uncertain future. Erich Honecker, the East German leader, was by now in his mid-70s and in declining health: senior Central Committee colleagues were finding him increasingly autocratic, inconsistent and unpredictable. The unwritten rules of "Republikflucht" – unlawful citizen escapes from East Germany – also seem to have been shifting. After 1988, Walter Priesnitz was the overall administrative head of the West German ministry most directly affected by the snowballing economic, political and social unravelling of East Germany. Among his own most important responsibilities was the "Häftlingsfreikauf" programme ("trading of East German political prisoners"). His East German negotiating partner was Wolfgang Vogel. In October 1985, somewhat to the surprise of fellow guests, Walter Priesnitz accompanied his departmental head, Ludwig A. Rehlinger, as a guest at Wolfgang Vogel's lavish "diplomatic" sixtieth birthday party in East Berlin. Despite their political differences, Priesnitz and Vogel were both clever political lawyers, both originally from Silesia: an effective working relationship of mutual respect between the two of them, seeming at times to border on friendship, was quickly established.

In 1984 hundreds of thousands of dissatisfied East Germans had for years had their names on the waiting list for exit visas which might at some stage be issued in the context of the "Häftlingsfreikauf" programme. In January that years six student dissidents made their way into the American embassy in East Berlin and announced that they would start a hunger strike which would last until they were released to the west. The ambassador was away in Washington and embassy staff had no idea what to do. Some days later they contacted the East German "Häftlingsfreikauf" negotiator who cut short his ski holiday and made his way to the embassy building in East Berlin, where the six defiant hunger strikers were confined, unable to shave or wash, in a room that was becoming notably fetid. He persuaded them to leave the building by promising that their case would be considered by the responsible government agencies during the next few weeks. He then left to telephone Heinz Volpert, the responsible Ministry for State Security (Stasi) officer, to discuss next steps. To his amazement, the Stasi had already received orders from on high that the six dissidents were to be delivered across the border into West Berlin that evening. With a diplomatic visit from the French foreign minister imminent, the leader simply wanted the matter to be concluded as quickly and quietly as possible. The implications of this ad hoc liberalisation for hundreds of thousands East Germans wishing to move west had apparently not been foreseen by Honecker. Nor had the potentially adverse impact on the cash payments from the west delivered by the "Häftlingsfreikauf" programme on which the cash-strapped East German government was becoming dependent. Wolfgang Vogel had known Erich Honecker for a long time, and was able to have his telephone call taken by the leader: "That could cause a chain reaction...", he began. But, as Vogel later recalled the conversation, he was cut short. "I don't think you've understood. I want them in West Berlin before midnight". Unsurprisingly, growing numbers of well-networked East German dissidents now began appearing at western embassies in East Berlin, and then also in neighbouring "socialist" states, demanding permission to "go west": a significant number had their demands accepted. Frequently, when these incidents occurred, it was Wolfgang Vogel who was summoned to attend the East Berlin embassy or diplomatic mission in question and resolve the matter quietly and deftly, but with intensifying misgivings about what the new informal approach might mean for the continuing "Häftlingsfreikauf" programme and more broadly for the future of the "German Democratic Republic".

By the time Priesnitz became Wolfgang Vogel's official western interlocutor in 1988, Vogel could no longer be confident of the ground rules from which he was meant to be negotiating on behalf of his government. As news of what was happening spread among the dis-satisfied, the number of would-be emigrants turning up at western embassies continued to grow. Then, in May 1989, an even less constrained escape route opened up when the Hungarian government removed the barbed wire and other physical barriers guarding the Hungarian border with Austria. Hundreds of East Germans turned up, mostly in family groups, "for camping holidays" in fields adjoining the border and abandoned their tents and Trabants in order to walk across the border. By August an estimated 2,000 had crossed to the west in this way. The knock-on effect in East Berlin was a further surge in the numbers storming western embassies. The West German diplomatic mission, overwhelmed by the numbers, closed its gates to the eastern citizens at the start of August 1989. It was not the first time that diplomatic staff had been driven to take this step in recent months, but the logistics situation were nevertheless becoming more unmanageable than ever. On 7 August 1989 Walter Priesnitz was sent east for urgent discussions with Wolfgang Vogel to determine a way forward. But Vogel, it seemed, was powerless to help. The leader was absent from his office, recovering from a gall-bladder operation, and party comrades deputising for him were not mandated to take decisions concerning the crowds attempting to emigrate by gaining access to the West German mission. Priesnitz implored his eastern counterpart to find a solution: "Mr Vogel, we are living in 1989, not 1984. If this is all you are in a position to do, that means the end of the German Democratic Republic". Vogel made no attempt to contradict him. When, later that month, Honecker returned to his office, he made it abundantly clear to Egon Krenz, who had emerged as his deputy and likely successor, that the problem of East German dissidents escaping to West Germany through the proliferating channels by now opening up was a problem for the West German government.

Meanwhile, the migrating refugees leaving East Germany, mostly intending to settle in West Germany, continued to proliferate at the available crossing routes, which by now included the West German embassies in Prague and Warsaw. Late in September 1989, sensing the continuing lack of direction from the government in East Berlin, Priesnitz finally sent a message to Vogel, suggesting that the two of them should together travel to Prague in order to speak in person with some of the asylum seekers gathered outside the West German embassy. "The mood was explosive", Priesnitz later recalled, "...the people did not trust anyone, and were embittered, because they believed that not enough was being done to help them". As they pressed through the crowd the two men were spat at. Vogel was particularly shocked that his diminutive and ever-present wife, Helga (who was not merely his wife but also, by all accounts, his most hard-working and long-standing administrative assistant) was also "brutally" jostled. Priesnitz attempted to be reassuring: "It has nothing to do with you [two] personally ... it is against the [East German] state that they want to show their contempt". Vogel and Priesnitz were clearly deeply affected both by the crowd outside the Prague embassy and by various encounters with individual members of it who related desperate personal tragedies of families that had been split by the hitherto repressive policies directed against would-be escapees and their families. It is not clear that the encounter of the two government lawyers with the German asylum seekers in Prague did anything to alter or postpone the course of history, however.

For most Germans the end was in sight for the one-party East German dictatorship. Reunification was a separate matter, which had yet to acquire a popular aura of inevitability, although over in Bonn Chancellor Kohl (who enjoyed a far warmer personal relationship with General Secretary Gorbachev than his ailing counterpart in East Berlin), probably already saw a clear route towards ending the forty-year division of Germany. Whatever the future might hold, by the end of 1989 the trading of East German political prisoners had become both an open secret and a humanitarian irrelevance. The final deal negotiated between Priesnitz and Vogel was reported in December 1989. This time payment was to be made not in cash, but as 15 million Marks worth of tropical fruits – reportedly mostly bananas – which would have been a welcome Christmas treat for East German city-dwellers. This time, not all the individuals whose freedom was being bartered were dissident East Germans imprisoned following failed attempts to escape from the country. There were also 25 employees of the West German and US intelligence services who had ended their missions incarcerated in East German jails. In addition, and usually, the human trade was not all one-way. There were also four West Germans who had been caught spying for Soviet intelligence who were now to be removed from their West German jail cells and sent across to the east. These included Margret Höke, a former secretary in the office of the West German president. And along with the espionage related cases, there were 100 "political prisoners" released from East German jails. During the final weeks of 1989 the pace of events accelerated, as others who had been imprisoned following failed escape attempts were simply released. On 19 December 1989 Wolfgang Vogel, having driven with his wife in their gold coloured Mercedes-Benz across into West Berlin in order to sign off the paper work, one by one, on each of the final tranche of 100 political former prisoners, was able to send a telex to the Ministry in Bonn: "From 24 December 1989 there are no longer any political detainees in the prisons of the German Democratic Republic".

=== Later career ===
The events of November/December 1989 led the West German government to conclude that a Ministry for Intra-German Relations was no longer necessary, and it was dissolved, formally on 20 December 1989. The minister remained in office until 17 January 1990, which was the final day before the opening of the new parliament, and it is likely that Walter Priesnitz continued to serve as the Ministry Secretary of state until that date. He served between January 1991 and March 1995 as Ministry Secretary of state at the Interior Ministry. Here he played a key role in negotiating and drawing up the reunification treaty and agreements under the ministerial direction of Wolfgang Schäuble, another law graduate.

Priesnitz then served, between 1996 and 1999, as chairman of the executive board of BVVG Bodenverwertungs- und -verwaltungs GmbH, a state-owned company based in Berlin, created by the government in 1992 in order to administer, lease out and as possible progressively sell state-owned agricultural and forest land in the so-called "New states" "... neuen Bundesländer" which after 1990 was the term commonly used in what had been West Germany to identify what had been East Germany between 1949 and 1990. It was always going to be a long job. Thanks to the sweeping scope "land reforms" of 1945/46, there were more than a million Hectares to be managed and, subject to various socially and politically driven criteria, disposed of. First refusal on sales of agricultural land was to be given to existing tenants who were not financially equipped to buy the land, while the long-term nature of the leases in force meant that tenants, having once registered an interest in principal to purchase their farms, were under no pressure from the lengths of the leases to rush off and find the necessary funds. The company, under the leadership of Priesnitz, who quickly became the company's public face in terms of its media interactions, seems to have been relaxed about the situation. (In 2015, when the affected regional governments agreed to extend the "privatization period" until 2030, the disposal process was still far from complete.)

He then stayed on at BVVG, elected to chair the supervisory board in 1999, and remaining in that post for eleven years until 2010, at which point his age was given as the reason for his not seeking re-election. He was succeeded by Gert Lindemann.

During his final years, almost to the end, he served as chair of the Jakob Kaiser foundation. In paying tribute to Priesnitz directly after he died, the foundation recalled his commitment to the maintenance and further development of its educational institutions in Königswinter and Weimar. (Note: The Jakob Kaiser foundation describes itself as an "independent non-party state-recognised institution for political youth and adult education ... committed to freedom, solidarity and justice ... committed to strengthening democracy and taking political responsibility for promoting European unity ... [trying to] build bridges to meet the new challenges of the time".)

=== Death ===
Walter Priesnitz died at Neuharlingersiel, (Note: On 27 August 2020 Wikipedia was describing Neuharlingersiel as "a small bucolic fishing village popular with artists [and] the setting of... the German version of the British Doc Martin series".) in the extreme north-west of Germany. He had been able to celebrate his eightieth birthday a few months earlier.

== Recognition ==
- 1991 "Großes Verdienstkreuz" (Great cross of merit)
- 2001 Saxony Constitution Medal ("Sächsische Verfassungsmedaille")
