= Ludwig Geißel =

- Born: 25 August 1916; Alzey, Grand Duchy of Hesse, Germany
- Died: 20 November 2000 (aged 84); Stuttgart, Baden-Württemberg, Germany
- Occupations: Charity Director (Evangelisches Hilfswerk); Prisoner release negotiator (Häftlingsfreikauf)

Ludwig Geißel (25 August 1916 - 20 November 2000) was a German charity administrator who became vice-president of Diakonisches Werk, a charitable organization of the Protestant / Evangelical churches in Germany). He was a co-founder of the Bread for the world programme.

His autobiography is subtitled "Unterhändler der Menschlichkeit" ("Negotiator of humanity"). This is a reference to the leading role he played as a negotiator during Germany's division between 1949 and 1989 into two separate and at times mutually antagonistic states. Based in West Germany, he was part of a movement on the part of the protestant churches in West Germany to maintain contacts and provide support for protestant congregations in East Germany, where the ruling party was ubiquitous and officially hostile to religions other than Communism. It was in connection with the church contacts that he was able to maintain across the Inner German border that Geißel became involved in the controversial and originally secret Trading of East German political prisoners ("Häftlingsfreikauf") programme that operated between 1962 and 1989.

== Life ==
=== Early years ===
Ludwig Geißel was born the eldest of his parents' five recorded children at the height of the First World War in Alzey, known then as now as a centre of the local wine growing industry. On successfully completing his schooling he joined the army. His first posting was to Jüterbog, where he served in the secret Military Intelligence Academy ("Heeresnachrichtenschule"). His leadership potential was identified early on. Between 1938 and 1945 he served as a member of the News Team of Hitler's Leadership Headquarters. When the invasion of Poland was launched he was stationed in Zossen-Wünsdorf, where News Regiment 601 was located.

By 1945 Geißel had reached the military rank of Captain ("Hauptmann"). War ended in May 1945 and he moved to Hamburg, intending to study at the university. Instead, however, he found himself in charge of a refugee camp. In this capacity he was an employee of the Hamburg Social Services department, subject to the direction of the Hamburg senate. In 1947 he resigned, joining instead the Charitable section of the Evangelical Churches ("Evangelisches Hilfswerk"). Geißel was a founder of the "East-west sponsorship" ("Patenschaftswerk West-Ost") initiative, intended to preserve the cultural traditions of the millions of Germans from the east of the country displaced by the 1945 frontier changes.

=== Career after the war ===
1949 was the year in which three post war occupation zones were relaunched as a new state, the German Federal Republic (West Germany). A few months later, in October, the Soviet occupation zone was relaunched as a separate Soviet sponsored state, the German Democratic Republic (East Germany). In West Germany the first general election took place in August 1949. At Lauenburg, a short distance upriver from Hamburg, Ludwig Geißel campaigned on behalf of the moderate-right CDU (party), of which he had become a member. As a result of his involvement in politics he came to know Herbert Wehner, a former Communist from Dresden and now a somewhat idiosyncratic SPD (moderate-left) politician representing a Hamburg electoral district, who in 1966 would serve as Minister of Intra-German Relations, politically an unusually sensitive post.

In 1950 Geißel became head of the Hamburg branch of the Evangelical Charity Organisation, instigating a Crisis Response section ("Katastrophenhilfe"), informally as a response to the catastrophic floods in the Netherlands in 1953, and founded formally in 1954. In 1955 he moved to the Evangelical Charity organisation's national head office in Stuttgart, taking charge of the Crisis Response section nationally. Following the merger of the Evangelical Charity Organisation with the church sponsored evangelical Inner mission, in 1957 he was appointed director of the combined organisation, still based in Stuttgart. His responsibilities encompassed finance, crisis response and administration. In 1972 he was appointed vice-president of what had by now evolved into Diakonischen Werkes der EKD e.V. He retired in 1982, but continued to contribute in an advisory capacity.

As a representative of the national church administration, Ludwig Geißel participated in various charity projects, often in ecumenical collaboration with bodies outside the Evangelical Church structure. The more memorable of these included looking after refugees from Hungary in the wake of the 1956 uprising. He was a co-initiator, and subsequently the leader, of the Bread for the World initiative, focused in the first instance on the famines in India. He was involved in organising mass evacuation airlifts from Nigeria to Gabon of child starvation victims during the Biafran War. He was also involved in earthquake relief work in Turkey, Greece, Iran and Italy.

On 9 June 1958 Ludwig Geißel started to operate as the "authorized representative of the West German national churches to the government of East Germany", with responsibility for the transfer of money from the protestant churches in West Germany to the Protestant Churches in East Germany. Because of the way the frontiers of East Germany had ended up in 1945, East Germany was overwhelmingly Protestant rather than Catholic. The imposition of church taxes in West Germany meant that the protestant churches in West Germany were, by international standards, cash rich. After 1958 roughly 40% of the income of the Protestant churches in West Germany was transferred to the Protestant churches in East Germany, and Ludwig Geißel played a role in the negotiation and administration of this little publicised initiative.

=== Häftlingsfreikauf ===
The Protestant Bishop of (West) Berlin, Kurt Scharf, took it upon himself to enter into discussions with the East German authorities on behalf of church workers whom the East Germans had imprisoned, but he soon became unacceptable as an interlocutor for the East Germans. He therefore appointed an assistant, a young lawyer who worked for the church called Reymar von Wedel, to undertake the task. Negotiations got under way involving von Wedel, the West German lawyer Jürgen Stange and an East Berlin lawyer Wolfgang Vogel. The discussions took place without publicity and the opening objectives of the parties are not clear, but by Christmas 1962 what had emerged was an agreement whereby twenty East German political prisoners and the same number of children were released to West Berlin in return for a delivery to East Germany of three rail wagons loaded with potash fertilisers. It is not clear whether this was a continuation of an existing covert arrangement involving the churches or the start of something new. In any event, what was new was the demand that the West German government should now be involved, and the West German Minister of Intra-German Relations, Erich Mende became officially responsible for what became in 1964, amid conditions of total secrecy, a West German government programme. By 1964 Geißel was taking on various task on behalf of the West German in facilitating and administering West German purchases of freedom for East German political prisoners identified on behalf of the West German government as being the most urgently deserving of release. Unlike others involved, following German reunification Geißel spoke little about his own involvement, details of which remain unclear, though some indications emerged over time. His negotiating partners from the East German side included the Head of the Secretariat of the Conference of Governing Bodies of the Evangelical Churches ("Geschäftsstelle der Evangelischen Kirchenleitungen"), Manfred Stolpe, who after 1989 became a leading politician in post-reunification Germany. Sources differ regarding the scale of the Häftlingsfreikauf programme: government sources acknowledged its existence only reluctantly and most details remain officially undisclosed, but one widely quoted figure indicates that slightly under 34,000 East German political prisoners had their freedom purchased by the West German government between 1963 and 1989.

=== Later years ===
In 1962 he joined the executive board of the Evangelical Churches' Development Aid administration, based in Bonn. He remained an energetic participant for many years, also working with the Lutheran World Federation and the World Council of Churches.

Following retirement Geißel continued to engage in church matters, notably in respect of health matters. Between 1984 and 1990 he chaired the administrative board of the Main Convent of St Olga's in Stuttgart, presiding over fundamental structural changes in organisation and administration, which culminated with the establishment in 1987 of "Karl-Olga-Altenpflege GmbH" ("Karl-Olga Old People's Care GmbH") as the main convent's sole subsidiary. He also chaired, for a time, the supervisory board of Karl-Olga-Krankenhaus GmbH ("Karl-Olga Hospital GmbH").
