= Brigitte Klump =

German author and campaigner (1935–2023)

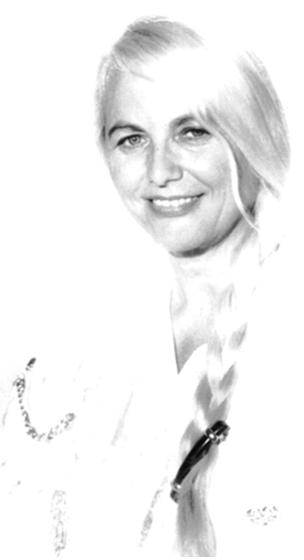
- Klump in 1984
- Born: 23 January 1935; Groß-Linichen, Germany
- Died: 10 July 2023 (aged 88)
- Occupations: Writer; Campaigner for reuniting divided families
- Spouse(s): 1. Johannes Zirwas (1958); 2. Wolf Heckmann (1960)
- Children: 2, including Inga Heckmann (singer-composer born 1966)

Brigitte Klump (23 January 1935 – 10 July 2023) was a German author and campaigner. She was born into a relatively poor farming family, originally of Huguenot provenance. She grew up, between 1949 and 1957, in the German Democratic Republic (East Germany) where she trained as a journalist, before undertaking an internship at the Theater am Schiffbauerdamm in Berlin. Here she was mentored by Brecht's widow, the actress-director Helene Weigel. Klump escaped to West Berlin in 1957.

Subsequently, invoking United Nations resolution 1503, she was able to help approximately 4,000 East German citizens escape to West Germany, thereby reuniting families divided by the political division of Germany. She later stated that this was, in part, a conscious atonement for the failings of a distant ancestor who had been a noted lawyer in Arles. During a period of religious persecution, he had enabled thousands of Waldensians to escape abroad by successfully delaying a trial, but 4,000 had nevertheless been killed.

Brigitte Klump claimed descent from King Louis XVI and Queen Marie Antoinette of France via their daughter, the twenty minute queen, Marie Thérèse Charlotte de Bourbon.

== Life ==
Brigitte Klump grew up the third of five siblings in Groß-Linichen, then a small village between Stettin and Bromberg in Pomerania. Her father was a small-scale farmer and tradesman. With the intensification of ethnic cleansing during 1945 the family fled on a hospital train, ending up in Glöwen, which after May found itself in the Soviet occupation zone in what remained of Germany. In October 1949 the area under Soviet administration was relaunched as a stand-alone Soviet sponsored state with its economic and political structures consciously modeled on those in the Soviet Union. Klump's father participated in the land ownership reforms, taking on leadership of the Landwirtschaftliche Produktionsgenossenschaft (LPG Agricultural Production Cooperative) in Glöwen.

Klump attended school in Havelberg, passing her school leaving exams (Abitur) in 1953, after which she worked in Berlin as a volunteer on the weekly newspaper "Der Freie Bauer" ("The free peasant"). In 1954 the paper's editorial management sent her to study at the Faculty of Journalism at Leipzig. The faculty, which at this time offered the only university-level journalism courses in the country, was popularly known as "das rote Kloster" ("the red monastery"). The faculty was surrounded by high walls which were lit up through the night. East German journalism students led privileged lives, well-fed in an era of acute austerity, but their mail was censored and there were listening devices in the rooms. The Ministry for State Security (Stasi) were omnipresent. Students were encouraged to spy and report on one another. Student contemporaries included Klaus Raddatz, Horst Pehnert and others who in the ensuing decades became senior political journalists in Germany's second one- party dictatorship.

In January 1956, Klump was set to write a seminar paper entitled "Die Vulgarisierung der Literatur durch Bertolt Brecht" (roughly "The vulgarisation of literature by Bertolt Brecht"). One of her tutors, Wieland Herzfelde, had published Brecht's work early in the dramatists' career and he arranged for an invitation from Brecht in order that a group of the Leipzig students might visit Brecht's theatre company at his theatre in Berlin. The University Culture Association organized a special train for 700 students to make the visit. However, at the last minute the train had to be cancelled by the authorities on account of track maintenance. Klumpe later learned from a confidant that the train cancellation had been a calculated message to Bertolt Brecht, traditionally a hero of socialism, but increasingly viewed by the authorities as troublesome. Helene Weigel, who for many years had been both Brecht's wife and his business partner, saw to it that the party leadership paid for the cancelled production. In Leipzig Brigitte Klump found herself the focus of blame for the fiasco, forced to grow out of her political naivete rapidly, and becoming familiar with the Stasi methods involving spying, denunciations and mind games used to pressure East German journalists.

Klumpe lacked the political motivation to submit to the surveillance duties that the security services assigned her, which involved spying on friends and fellow students: she sought advice from Helene Weigel. Brecht's death from a heart attack in August 1956 suddenly left Weigel as the widowed sole director of the Brecht Theatre. Weigel was able to offer Klumpe an interneeship at Berlin in theatrical production, under the supervision Brecht's former "master student", Benno Besson. during the 1956/57 season. As matters turned out, once Klumpe moved to Berlin, Weigel herself also took her in hand. Klumpe learned why the theatre principal showed her such kindness from other actors. "You are the first girl in the theatre that hasn't passed through Brecht's hands" When she protested that she would have been much too young to be of interest to the grand old man of East German theatre, Klumpe reported that she was assured, "that would not have put him off: on the contrary....".

During early 1957 Hermann Budzislawski, the dean of the Leipzig Journalism Faculty, discussed the case of Brigitte Klump in an informal chat with the theatre director Helene Weigel. He made it clear that undertaking surveillance duties on behalf of the Ministry for State Security was a necessary precondition for receiving the diploma necessary to work as a socialist journalist. It would be more than another three years before the ever more intensive political division of Berlin was reinforced with a physical wall: on 13 November 1957 Brigitte Klump fled to West Berlin and enrolled at the Free University of Berlin in order to progress her studies. She subsequently removed herself from university before completing her degree course.

== Highlights ==
=== "Das rote Kloster" ===
By 1978 Brigitte Klump was ready to publish her first book, "Das rote Kloster". The book was a quasi-autobiographical work based on her time as a journalism student in Leipzig. The publishers were Hoffmann und Campe, a long-established publishing house based in Hamburg. Although both the author and the publisher were residents in West Germany, the subject matter concerned East Germany where the authorities became concerned over the book's imminent appearance. The East German Ministry of Culture, communicating through Otto Gotsche, a writer turned politician who since 1966 had been a member of the country's powerful Party Central Committee, offered the Hamburg publisher Rüdiger Hildebrandt one million marks to acquire the rights to the book in order to prevent its publication. Hildebrandt rejected the offer, however, because he did not want to go down in history as the publisher who had suppressed a book.

Although it dealt with a period twenty years earlier, this was the first book to shine a light on the so-called "Red Monastery" - the Leipzig University Faculty of Journalism. Those who knew about it had thus far kept their mouths shut for fear of reprisals, because although the faculty operated formally under the aegis of the university, it was in reality a training academy controlled by the Party Central Committee. Klump indicated that she herself had delayed publication for nineteen years in order sufficiently to distance herself from the emotional encumbrances of her time in Leipzig. When she fled to the west in 1957 she was, like all her fellow students, a "Civil reserve officer" ("Reserveoffiziersbewerber") of the German Democratic Republic. It was a precept of Leninist doctrine that journalists were the sharpest weapon in the party arsenal. Brigitte Klump identifies the principal protagonists in her record by name. None of those named has ever filed a complaint alleging that dialogues reported are not authentic. The book is not presented as any kind of "reckoning" with the past, and shuns defamation. Klump simply provides a factual record of her experiences with the Ministry for State Security and with fellow students such as Reiner Kunze, Helga M. Novak and Wolf Biermann. "Das rote Kloster" was written in 5½ months, and continued to be available in various editions for twenty years, till 1998.

The appearance of "Das rote Kloster" in November 1978, was accompanied by a resounding media fanfare, and it quickly climbed the bestseller lists although the critics were not universally adulatory, with Dieter Hildebrandt complaining in Die Zeit of syntax appearing in recorded conversations that felt more resonant of the seventies than of the fifties, the decade in which the action of the book is set.

=== Private plaintiff before the United Nations ===
For some years after the establishment, in 1949, of separate West and East German states, the frontier between the two was completely porous. During the 1950s the economic performance of the two states diverged as West Germany recovered strongly and East Germany did not. Sources differ over the extent to which political repression also triggered or exacerbated discontent, but a spate of high-profile show trials in East Berlin followed by a forcibly suppressed uprising in 1953 make it clear that the methods employed by the party to consolidate and maintain power in East Germany were not universally accepted. Through the 1950s there was a steady stream of East Germans migrating to the West, with the working age demographic featuring disproportionately. Birgitte Klump was part of that. By August 1961, when the Berlin Wall made escape from East Germany not merely illegal but also under most circumstances impossible, East Germany was desperately short of workers. The closing of the frontier had been a progressive process, however, and it left many families physically and apparently permanently divided. In 1979 the issue became personal when Brigitte's nineteen-year-old nephew, Klaus Klump, attempted to escape across the border in order to become a journalist with the Hamburg newspaper edited by his uncle, Wolf Heckmann. The escape attempt failed, and 1980 found young Klaus Klump was still imprisoned in a Cottbus jail.

By this time the secret "Häftlingsfreikauf" agreement whereby the West German government purchased the freedom of the "most deserving" East German political prisoners was becoming less secret, and attempts were made to secure release for Klaus by this route, but the message came back from the East German deal maker Wolfgang Vogel that Klaus Klump was not available for release. Brigitte Klump now sought help from the West German Foreign Ministry and from the General Secretariat of the United Nations in New York. She became aware of United Nations resolution 1503, which in 1970 had established a "confidential complaints procedure". This, importantly, provided for investigation from outside a sovereign state, in cases of suspected major systematic breaches of human rights. Starting in 1980, Klump prepared to present herself as a "private litigant" to the United Nations in Geneva. Klaus Klump and his parents were able to leave East Germany on 13 November 1980, three months after the handing over of the relevant application documents and evidence under UN resolution 1503, which was seen as confirmation of the effectiveness of Brigitte Klump's methods. It now seemed that the East German government might be persuaded to hand over political prisoners to the West without the need for a ransom payment, by invoking the United Nations. She took steps to publicise the existence of Resolution 1503, and where negotiations involving locally intransigent East German officials failed, the approach, in the end, succeeded in reuniting families by winning the release of perhaps 4,000 political prisoners from East to West Germany, though it is hard to be sure how many of the releases apparently secured by this method were of prisoners who would not otherwise have been released through the operation of the existing secret bilateral arrangements between the two German governments.

Klump's second book appeared in 1981. It was entitled "Freiheit hat keinen Preis: ein deutsch-deutscher Report" (loosely: "Freedom has no price: an inter-German report"). It set out how the idea of involving the United Nations in attempts to free her nephew had originated from discussions with a family friend who was an Argentinian diplomat. She had then contacted Rüdiger von Wechmar, the West German ambassador to the United Nations, who had sent her with her petition to the UN General Secretariat. Her further research with UN officials in Geneva indicated that a petition on account of a single detainee was unlikely to progress very far, and that she should try and aggregate at least 20 cases that might be bundled together in a joint application. Reports now appeared in the West German press that a housewife had found a "hole in the [Berlin] wall". She received thousands of pleas for help, and she very quickly assembled a first dossier concerning 23 (East) German citizens identified as deserving of release from political imprisonment. This first joint application was submitted early in 1981. East Germany found itself in the dock at the United Nations. For the first time, the UN was concerning itself with cases of human rights abuse in the German Democratic Republic.

=== Hunger strike in support of East German Sportsmen and women ===
The East German leadership was always sensitive to the international prestige of the state, and sporting success played an important part in enhancing the regime's international standing in its own eyes. The country's sportsmen and women enjoyed international travel privileges that were denied to their fellow citizens, and as a result of which a number escaped to the west, over the years while competing abroad. Where successful escapes resulted in divided families, the Party Central Committee was particularly obstinate in resisting pressure to enable the families of escaped sports celebrities to join them in the West. In 1984 Brigitte Klump mobilised a hunger strike which was joined by athletes and then also by many high school students. The ensuing media storm persuaded Egon Krenz, at that time the Politburo member responsible for sports politics, to lift the travel ban on the split families of the escaped sportsmen and women.

After reunification in 1990 the lawyer who had negotiated the "Häftlingsfreikauf" releases on behalf of the East German government, Wolfgang Vogel, wrote to Brigitte Klump a letter, dated 13 November 1991, apologizing that he had not been permitted to co-operate with her ("dass sie unter den damaligen Verhältnissen nicht kooperieren durften") under the structures in place before 1990. He also stressed that he had not himself had any involvement in the releases secured as a result of her United Nations applications. The East German authorities had been influenced by a strong fear of any diminution in the country's reputation internationally. It was from Vogel that the figure of 4,000 came, as the number of East German citizens who had been released without any of the financial incentives involved in "Häftlingsfreikauf", because they had appeared on Brigitte Klump's lists for submission to the international body. In cases where the Stasi petitioned against release of victims on Klump's list, a telegramme from Klump to the East German legal authorities could be followed by authorization of their release to the west within fourteen days. The country's senior legal officers were generally keen to avoid United Nations appearances. As soon as a fresh application with a new list of prisoner release applications had been lodged with the UN authorities in Geneva, the authorities in East Germany usually released those listed without waiting for the matter to proceed to a hearing.

=== Security services ===
After reunification research in the Stasi records disclosed that Brigitte Klump had been identified by the Ministry for State Security as an "enemy of the state" ("Feindperson") across the Inner-German border. She was assigned to the ministry's "Central Coordination Group (ZKG) - Department 5", and included in a more wide ranging programme under the code name "Kloster", which was presumably a reference to the title of her first book. Until 1989 Klump was one of those targeted for one of the Stasi's systematic undermining campaigns. Officials from the Stasi chief's office circulated instructions to 19 East German departments of state to undertake activities that involved spreading compromising misinformation and espionage activities against the author and her family.

== Personal life ==
Brigitte Klump married firstly in 1958 to Johannes Zirwas who later became a sociology professor.

Her second marriage, in 1960, was to Wolf Heckmann (1929–2006), a journalist-writer who in 1969 became editor-in-chief of the Hamburger Morgenpost, a mass-circulation daily newspaper. This marriage resulted in two recorded children, including the singer-composer Inga Heckmann. Klump's second marriage ended in 1988.

Klump died on 10 July 2023, at the age of 88.
