= Schowtka =

Schwotka is a surname. Notable people with the surname include:

- Alexander Schowtka (born 1963), German swimmer
- Peter Schowtka (1945–2022), German politician
