= Sächsische Verfassungsmedaille =

German award

The Sächsische Verfassungsmedaille (Saxon Constitutional Medal) is awarded by the Free State of Saxony to persons who have rendered outstanding services to the liberal democratic development of the Free State.

It was founded in 1997 to mark the fifth anniversary of the final vote on the constitution of the Free State of Saxony and to commemorate the peaceful revolution in 1989 and is awarded annually by the president of the Landtag of Saxony, the state parliament. From 1997 to 2022, the medal was awarded to 181 people. The medal is made of silver.

== Selected recipients ==
Year	Date	Recipient	
1997	26 May	Martin Böttger	civil rights activist
1997	26 May	Jörg-Peter Weigle	conductor
2001	26 May	Walter Priesnitz	"Häftlingsfreikauf" negotiator usw.
2002	27 May	Kurt Biedenkopf	minister president
2003	2 May	Vytautas Landsbergis	former president of Lithuania
2005	26 May	Ludwig Güttler	Restoration of the Frauenkirche
2005	26 May	Matthias Rößler	Saxon education policy
2008	31 May	Hans-Christoph Rademann	Engagement for art and culture in and for Saxony
2011	28 May	Erich Iltgen	former president of the Landtag
2012	2 June	Roderich Kreile	Kreuzkantor
2016	25 June	Peter Schowtka	member of the Landtag of Saxony
2020	18 July	Mordechay Lewy	diplomat and historian
