= Alfred Zehe =

German physicist, professor and author (born 1939)

Alfred Zehe (born May 23, 1939) is a German physicist, professor and author. After American authorities charged him with spying for the East German government in 1983, he became part of a high-profile prisoner exchange between the U.S. and the Soviet Union.

== Early life and education ==
Born in Farnstädt, Germany, Alfred Zehe was trained from a young age to be an underground copper miner. In 1964, he graduated from the University of Leipzig with a degree in physics; in 1969, he received the degree of Doctor rerum naturalium; and in 1975, he received the degree of Doctor scientiae naturalium. He held a chair in Experimental Physics at the Technical University of Dresden from 1980 to 1991, during which time he taught periodically at the Autonomous University of Puebla in Puebla, Mexico. Prior to the 1990 German reunification, Zehe's ability to travel, including his teaching at University of Puebla, was contingent on his consulting with the East German government on matters of national security.

== Sting Operation and Arrest ==
In 1982, Zehe was summoned from Puebla to the East German embassy in Mexico City to meet with East German officials, who sought Zehe's expertise regarding recently acquired documents on sonar technology. Unbeknownst to Zehe at the time, the documents had been purchased by East German agents from an undercover U.S. operative in Washington, D.C.

The U.S. operative, in an FBI-managed sting operation, had gone shopping on Washington's embassy row "to lure a spy from one or another of the Communist embassies to come out and take the bait." After purchasing the documents, the East Germans realized they lacked the expertise in Washington to evaluate the intelligence, so they called on Zehe in Mexico City. There, he reviewed the documents, which turned out to be outdated information on submarine sonar-detection, and returned to his teaching post in Puebla.

On November 3, 1983, Zehe was arrested while attending the annual symposium of the American Vacuum Society in Boston. He was subsequently charged under the Espionage Act with conspiracy to obtain classified documents related to military technology and deliver them to a foreign government.

The decision to arrest him at the conference with television cameras on hand was designed to fuel public awareness of the dangers of scientific espionage.

The FBI later asked the American Vacuum Society to furnish it with the names of the 2600 attendees at the Boston meeting and threatened to subpoena the information. The Society declined but replied that it would comply with such a subpoena. The FBI did not pursue the matter.

The East German government posted bail for Zehe in June 1984. He remained in Boston while awaiting trial.

Wolfgang Vogel, East German lawyer and spy trader, was enlisted by the East German government to help free Zehe. Vogel contacted Alan Dershowitz to oversee the legal aspects of the effort and Ronald Greenwald to act as personal liaison between him and Zehe. Dershowitz, seeking to avoid a conflict of interest with his then-client Anatoly Shcharansky, a founder of the Refusenik movement who had been imprisoned in Moscow for allegedly spying for the United States, brought in Harvey A. Silverglate to defend Zehe.

Silverglate claimed that under any reasonable interpretation of the Espionage Act, Zehe had not committed a crime. Zehe did not purchase the documents at issue in the case, but only reviewed documents presented to him in Mexico City, Silverglate asserted. He also told how at Robert Mueller's direction, prosecutors used "national security" as a reason to withhold documents from the defense even though they were prepared to let the East Germans review them. Silverglate further contended that the indictment was invalid because the Espionage Act does not cover espionage conducted by a foreign citizen outside the United States.

On January 29, 1985, U.S. District Judge David S. Nelson denied Zehe's motion to dismiss the case, ruling that the Espionage Act could be applied extraterritorially to both citizens and noncitizens because of the threat to national security that espionage poses.

U.S. prosecutors then offered to allow Zehe to defect to the United States, where he could take residence and continue his academic career. Despite being closely watched by the East German government, Zehe accepted this offer and agreed to defect. Shortly thereafter, however, the U.S. government refused to accept Zehe as a bona fide defector. He was left with the option of either pleading guilty and hoping for a light sentence, or pleading not-guilty and testing the American legal system.

On February 25, 1985, Zehe entered a plea of guilty. He submitted to a full debriefing in exchange for the promise of a light sentence. He was sentenced to 8 years in prison.

== Prisoner Exchange ==
Zehe was released in June 1985 as part of an exchange of four East Europeans held by the U.S. for 25 people held in Poland and East Germany, none of them American. The exchange took place on the Glienicke Bridge linking West Berlin with Potsdam, East Germany.

Silverglate used Zehe's case to argue against the 2001 appointment of Robert Mueller to head the FBI. On another occasion, Silverglate argued that the FBI was trying to acquire assets it could trade with Eastern European governments, part of what he termed "spy trading culture."

== Academic career ==
In his academic career, Zehe's major research fields have been materials science, solid-state electronics, and vacuum physics. He is the author of Tecnologia epitaxial de silicio (2001 with Andreas Thomas) and Herramientas Analiticas de Interfaces Solidas (2002).
