= Hans-Joachim Griephan =

German journalist

Hans-Joachim Griephan (born 26 September 1937) is a German journalist, publisher and founder of the "Wirtschaftsinformationsdienst" published since 1964, the Griephan Briefe.

== Life and career ==
Griephan was born in Malchin. After a childhood in Mecklenburg, Griephan left the GDR in the early 1950s and went first to West Berlin, later to the federal capital Bonn. He began his journalistic career in 1958 at the Berliner Morgenpost and in 1961 moved to the US news agency United Press International as a correspondent, initially in the Berlin, then in the Bonn bureau.

In 1964, Griephan was for some months an editorial member of Die Zeitung – Ein deutsches Magazin at the publishing house Waldemar Schweitzer in Stuttgart (together with Sigfrid Dinser and Helmut Markwort)

From 1964 to 1993, Griephan edited the journal Wehrdienst. Der Informationsbrief für die Verteidigungswirtschaft.

Griephan was a columnist for a time in 1979 for the Wirtschaftswoche (Hans-Joachim Griephan über Behördenaufträge). For the Welt am Sonntag, Hamburg, Griephan wrote from 1979 to 1981 a weekly column "Bonner Geschäfte". Von 1980 bis 1985 veröffentlichte das Unternehmermagazin Impulse, Cologne, Griephans Kolumne "Geschäfte mit dem Staat".

In Bonn, Griephan was managing partner of the 3-W-Büro Agentur für Wehr-Wirtschafts-Werbung from 1969 to 1993. GmbH bzw. Bonnservice Werbe & Beratungsdienste GmbH.

In 1979, the member of the Bundestag Heinz Pensky (SPD) filed a criminal complaint for insult against Griephan. When the Gesetz über die Kontrolle von Kriegswaffen was amended in 1978, Pensky had pushed through a strict restriction of any arms trade by German citizens and from West German soil. The offence ("Dämelack") was linked to the accusation that Pensky was causing difficulties for the German arms industry in the international arms trade. In a settlement, Griephan assumed the costs of the proceedings. He retracted his insult and Pensky the criminal charge.

== Other activities ==
Until 1988 Griephan was deputy president of the Fritz Reuter Gesellschaft e. V., founded in 1960 in Lübeck. (FRG), then president. In 1991 it moved its seat from Lübeck to Neubrandenburg. On Griephan's initiative, the Förderverein Reuter-Museen e. V. was founded in 1991 to support the four Reuter museums in Stavenhagen, Eisenach, Neubrandenburg and Dömitz. Griephan is founder and owner of the Fritz Reuter Literary Archive in Berlin (formerly Privates Fritz Reuter Literaturarchiv [FRLA], Bonn). He is considered an important autograph collector on 19th century literature. Since 2018, Griephan has been gradually transferring his collection as a gift to the Staatsbibliothek zu Berlin – Preußischer Kulturbesitz, which is making these holdings accessible in Estate 597 (Collection Hans-Joachim Griephan).

In the second half of the 1980s, triggered by his leadership activities in the Fritz Reuter Society, Griephan was subjected to spying by the Ministry for State Security of the GDR. The reason for this was the joint effort of the head of the Federal Agency for All-German Tasks (BfgA) Detlef Kühn and Griephan to gain influence on the handling of the Fritz Reuter legacy in the GDR, according to the GDR authorities "in the all-German sense". Such things were rejected there and attempts were made to stop it. Informants about Griephan included in particular the unofficial collaborator Jürgen Borchert, GDR dissident winner of the Fritz Reuter Art Prize of the Schwerin district (1980),; the prize is not to be confused with the biennial Fritz Reuter Prize awarded by the Hamburg Carl Toepfer Foundation. Klaus Meyer, Arnold Hückstädt, Marion Schmidt, (Mecklenburg Folklore Centre). After Borchert committed suicide in the course of the affair, Griephan was accused in the regional newspapers in Neubrandenburg, Rostock and Schwerin, by the Evangelical Academy of Mecklenburg-Vorpommern as well as by the then PDS of having "finished Borchert off with the Stasi club" (Wolf Spillner).

For the election periods 1994 to 1999 and 1999 to 2004, Griephan was elected to the city council of Neubrandenburg for the CDU.

== Publications ==
- Fritz Reuter und Berthold Auerbach. Ein Brief Reuters an Auerbach und ein Manuskript Auerbachs über Reuter, in Ulf Bichel/Friedrich Minssen/Helmut de Voss, Vom Reichtum des Erzählens. Fritz Reuter 1810–1874, München/Wien 1985, pp. 243–253
- Die Bedeutung des Reutergeldes Fünfteilige Folge in Mecklenburg : Heimatzeitschrift für Landsleute und Freunde Mecklenburgs, volu. 26, 1984, No. 7 pp. 6–7, No. 8 pp. 10–11, No. 9 pp. 7–8, No. 10 pp. 10–11, No. 11 pp. 12–13

== Headlines ==
From reports by upi correspondent Hans-Joachim Griephan:

- Berlin: Ostberlin gleicht einer belagerten Stadt. Volkspolizei-Einheiten kampieren auf den Straßen. Unruhe und Empörung unter der Bevölkerung (in Göttinger Tageblatt and other papers, 14 August 1961)
- Berlin: Volkspolizist mit Herz ließ Menschen durch den Stacheldraht. Möbel der Flüchtlinge zu Schleuderpreisen an SED-Funktionäre (in Offenbach-Post and other papers, 18 August 1961)
- Berlin: General Clay: "Wenn es Ernst wird, bin ich da" (in Düsseldorfer Spätausgabe and other papers, 22 August 1961)
- Berlin: Straße der Tränen. In der Bernauer Straße geht die Spaltung durch die Herzen – Beton und Stacheldraht (in Hamburger Echo and other papers, 1 September 1961)
- Berlin: Strohhut-Emil sagt: "Ick will sterben ..." Ein Teller Erbsensuppe wartet bei Aschinger vergebens. Berliner Original muß im Osten bleiben (in Frankfurter Nachtausgabe and other papers, 13 January 1962)
- Rostock: „Wie die Verpflegung – so die Bewegung“ Die Landwirtschaft im SED-Staat steht vor einer neuen Krise – Der Schlendrian als Form des Widerstandes (in Fuldaer Zeitung and other papers, 24 July 1962)
- Berlin: Kranke Mutter am Strick in die Freiheit gezerrt. 13 Menschen erzählen die dramatische Geschichte ihrer Tunnelflucht (in Bremer Nachrichten and other papers, 14 March 1963)
- Bonn: Das Palais Schaumburg sah Playboys und Besatzer. Ludwig Erhard neuer Herr im "Hause des Bundeskanzlers" – Nur das Schlafzimmer mochte Adenauer nicht (in Nord-West-Zeitung and other papers, 10 October 1963)
- Lengede: Schaumgummi-Matratzen für die Eingeschlossenen. „Komfort“ in 90 Meter Tiefe. Frische Wäsche, aber unrasiert – Huhn sprang aus der Dose (in Bonner Generalanzeiger and other papers, 30 October 1963)
- Lengede: Freude ohne Jubel über die Rettung nach 184 Stunden. Die drei Geretteten wollen sich überlegen, ob sie wieder einfahren (in Der Mittag and other papers, 2 November 1963)
- Lengede: Die Mutter Courage von Lengede. "Mich schickt keiner weg" Glückliche Bergmannsfrau will an der Bohrstelle bis zum Ende warten (in Göttinger Tageblatt and other papers, 5 November 1963)
- Lengede: So wurden die elf Bergleute geborgen. Lengede: "Wunder" wurde wahr. Bei strahlend blauem Himmel taumelte einer nach dem anderen ins Sonnenlicht (in Bonner Generalanzeiger and other papers, 8. November 1963)
