= Ronnie Greenwald =

American rabbi

Rabbi Ronnie Greenwald
- Born: January 8, 1934; New York City, U.S.
- Died: January 20, 2016 (aged 82); Florida, U.S.
- Occupations: Negotiator and educator

Ronald Greenwald (January 8, 1934 – January 20, 2016) was an American Orthodox Jewish rabbi, who was a businessman and an educator.

Born in New York City, he made a career of spy trading, international hostage mediation, and other forms of high-stakes, high-intrigue diplomacy. He served as presidential liaison of President Richard Nixon to the Jewish community during the Nixon administration. He served as a community activist, chaired various civic boards, directed a high school and a summer camp, and was the chairman of Magenu.

== Background and early life ==
Ronald Greenwald was born to European Jewish immigrant parents and raised on the Lower East Side of Manhattan before his family relocated to Brownsville (in Brooklyn). He studied at Telshe Yeshiva in Cleveland after high school. After getting married, he settled in Boro Park in Brooklyn. In the early years of his marriage, he worked as a teacher of both Judaic and secular studies in Brooklyn yeshivas.

Greenwald became active in politics in 1962 (at the age of 28) lobbying on behalf of Torah Umesorah to promote the creation and success of Jewish day schools in the United States. At the request of Jewish activist George Klein, Greenwald became involved in the gubernatorial campaign of Nelson A. Rockefeller and helped Rockefeller win an unprecedented share of the Jewish vote for a Republican at the time. After this success, the Rockefeller campaign recommended Greenwald to the campaign of Richard M. Nixon and the Nixon re-election campaign appointed Greenwald to work for the President's 1972 re-election in the Jewish community. In winning 35% of the Jewish vote in 1972, Nixon, like Rockefeller, did far better among Jewish voters than would be expected from a Republican in that era.

Letter from U.S. President Richard Nixon to Greenwald.

During the Nixon administration, Greenwald served as liaison between the administration and the Jewish community in a variety of ways. He obtained a $1 million grant to open a legal aid office in Brooklyn to assist the needy in the community of Williamsburg among other accomplishments.

During the Watergate scandal, Greenwald contacted various Democratic Jewish members of Congress, including Elizabeth Holtzman, Bella Abzug and Arlen Specter to try to convince them that impeaching the President would weaken the United States and, by extension, hurt Israel, which, in the wake of the Yom Kippur War needed the support of a strong United States. Although his entreaties did not work, as President Nixon was eventually forced to resign rather than face impeachment, he did earn a Presidential letter of thanks (see the letter at the bottom of this article). He died in his sleep while on vacation in Florida, on January 20, 2016.

== Involvement in notable release efforts ==
Greenwald was involved in scores of release efforts for various prisoners from around the world.

=== Natan Sharansky ===
Greenwald taking to Secretary of State Henry Kissinger, with whom he worked closely in a series of hostage release efforts, including the Sharansky case

In perhaps his highest profile case, Greenwald worked closely with Representative Benjamin Gilman (R-NY) and East German lawyer Wolfgang Vogel to secure the release of Soviet dissident and Refusenik Natan Sharansky from Soviet prison in the late 1970s. He made more than 25 trips across the "Iron Curtain" to East Germany as part of that effort. The Rockland Journal News reported that Greenwald was the "man behind the talks" that freed Sharansky.

=== Miron Markus ===
In conjunction with Representative Gilman, Greenwald negotiated the rescue a 24-year-old Israeli citizen named Miron Markus in 1978 who was living in Zimbabwe. Markus was captured when an airplane piloted by his brother-in-law, Jackie Bloch, was forced to land in Mozambique, where Mr. Bloch was killed and Markus taken hostage. Greenwald, Congressman Gilman and others arranged for a complex swap that involved four countries Mozambique, Israel, the UnS and East Germany, convicted East German spy Robert Thompson and U.S. student Alan van Norman.

=== Raul Granados ===
Granados was kidnapped by leftist guerillas in November, 1979 while at a soccer game in Guatemala City. Greenwald, working again with Representative Gilman, helped broker the exchange of Mr. Granados in exchange for a ransom payment of $4,000,000.

=== Vladimir Raiz ===
Vladimir Raiz, a Soviet molecular biologist, had been denied permission to leave the former Soviet Union for 18 years before Greenwald entered the picture. According to Steve Lieberman in the Rockland Journal News, Greenwald secretly met with Raiz in Lithuania in 1989. Following negotiations with Soviet authorities, Raiz and his family were permitted to emigrate in 1990.

=== Shabattai Kalmanovich ===
Greenwald was involved in the transfer of Shabattai Kalmanovich from the USSR to Israel. However, in 1987 Kalmanovitch was arrested in Tel Aviv and charged with being a KGB spy and sentenced to nine years in prison in 1987 for spying for the Soviet Union. He was released from prison after five years and returned to Russia. On November 2, 2009, Kalamovitch was assassinated in Moscow.

=== Lori Berenson ===
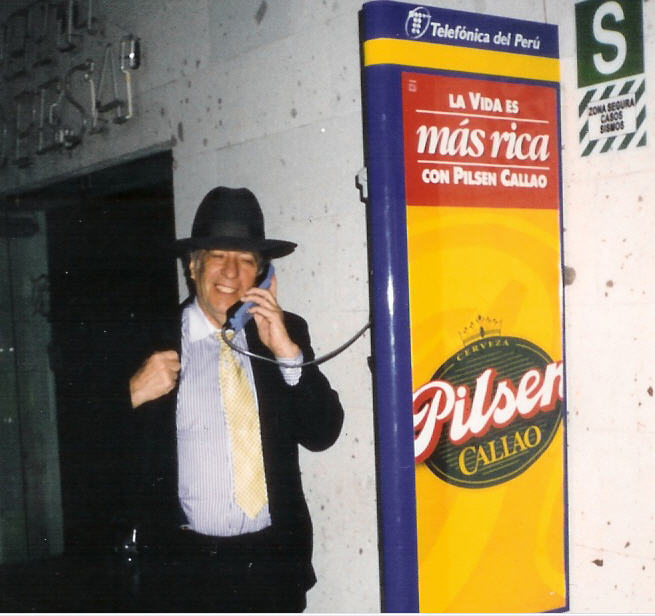
Greenwald in Peru, working on the Berenson case

In 1994, political activist and New York native Lori Berenson was arrested, tried and sentenced to life imprisonment for treason by a Peruvian military tribunal. She was accused of belonging to a Marxist rebel group and plotting to overthrow the Peruvian government. Because of the shady circumstances surrounding her trial and her harsh sentence, Amnesty International, in 2003, referred to Berenson as a "political prisoner."

With the support of President Bill Clinton in 2000, Greenwald led a delegation of American negotiators to Peru to press the Peruvian government to free Berenson or, at least, to grant her a new trial in a civilian court. The effort succeeded and Berenson was afforded a new trial in civilian court. At her subsequent trial, Berenson was convicted again and sentenced to 20 years imprisonment.

=== Jonathan Pollard ===
Greenwald was involved in many of the attempts to gain clemency for Jonathan Pollard by convincing the then serving President of the United States to pardon Pollard or to commute his sentence. Particularly noteworthy was his effort to set up a three-way trade involving Israel, the US and Russia. Under Greenwald's proposal, Israel would release Professor Marcus Klingberg, who was being held by Israel or suspected Russian spy Shabattai Kalmanovich to Russia, the Russians would release Dmitri Polyakov (known to the FBI as "Top Hat") or Anatoly Filatov, who were both being held by Russia on suspicion of having spied for the United States, and the U.S. would pardon Pollard and allow him to move to Israel. Congressman Benjamin Gilman and Sam Nunn's former chief of staff, Jeff Smith (who would later become chief council for the CIA), were also involved in the proposed transaction.

Unfortunately for Pollard, the effort broke down when Yossi Ben Aharon, assistant to Israeli Prime Minister Yitzhak Shamir insisted on Israel negotiating directly with the Russians rather than through an intermediary such as Greenwald. The Israeli negotiating effort never gained traction, and Pollard remained in prison until 2015.

Greenwald's and others' efforts to convince U.S. President Bill Clinton to commute Pollard's sentence were hampered in large part by a letter written to Clinton by Donald Rumsfeld and signed by seven former Secretaries of Defense, urging the President not to pardon Pollard. (See letter on right.)

=== Alfred Zehe ===
In 1983, Dr. Alfred Zehe, an East German scientist attending a conference in Massachusetts, was arrested for conspiracy to violate U.S. espionage laws for allegedly handing secret "sonar plan" documents to East German operatives in Mexico. East German lawyer and spy trader Wolfgang Vogel was put in charge of the effort to free Zehe. He brought in Alan Dershowitz to oversee the legalities of the effort and Greenwald to act as a person liaison between him and Zehe.

Greenwald visited Zehe several times in prison. During this time, he learned that Zehe was being threatened with being brought to trial under espionage charges that carried the threat of many decades in prison while being cajoled to turn over to the CIA whatever information he had that might be helpful to that agency. Greenwald conveyed messages to Zehe from his family urging him to do whatever it took to allow himself to be released as soon as possible. Eventually, Zehe pleaded guilty and conducted a full debriefing in exchange for the promise of a light sentence. He was released as part an exchange of agents in June 1985.

== Speaking career ==
Greenwald was a featured speaker at many conventions and gatherings throughout his career. Recently, he spoke at the Agudath Israel of America Convention. He also spoke at the Aish Partners Conference.

== Media coverage ==
Jack Anderson, in the December 3, 1988, edition of the Washington Post, reported that Greenwald was working on an effort to persuade U.S. authorities to release convicted spy Jonathan Pollard, who had been condemned to life imprisonment. Those efforts were unsuccessful, and Pollard remained in prison until his parole in 2015. With regard to Pollard, Greenwald has commented "With the Pollard case there's not exactly anti-Semitism, but rather the issue of Israel and how the State Department looks at Jews and feels about Israel, and I believe there's a bias." Earlier, Anderson had insinuated in a previous column that Greenwald had ties to the CIA, Mossad and KGB.

Greenwald meeting with Italian Prime Minister Giulio Andreotti regarding an upcoming trip to Libya to meet Libyan President Muammar al-Gaddafi

On February 3, 1986, the ABC Evening News with Peter Jennings credited Greenwald with playing a role in the negotiations for the release of Sharansky and featured a video clip of Greenwald expressing optimism that Sharansky would be released.

His high-placed connections and adventures involving delicate international diplomacy have led to speculation (albeit groundless) about nefarious connections to legal and illegal organizations around the world. As of May 2006, no fewer than 20 websites (mostly anti-Semitic sites) have alleged that Greenwald has or had mafia connections.

On March 9, 1990, a Rockland Journal News headline called Greenwald a "master of international negotiation" and credited him with playing prominent roles in the freeing of Sharansky, Marcus, Granados and several others.

The USA Today also credited Greenwald for arranging the release of Sharansky and commented that his dealings with famed international mediators such as Wolfgang Vogel during various negotiations resembled a "spy novel."

=== Television interviews regarding the New Square Pardon Affair ===
Following the pardon by President Bill Clinton of several convicted members of the New Square Hassidic community, Greenwald was interviewed by several media outlets regarding his opinion and even his role in the affair. The fact that Greenwald had ties to the New Square community, was a former business associate of Marc Rich, another person pardoned by Clinton at the end of his term and had been questioned by the FBI during its investigation into the pardons, made his opinions regarding the incident highly sought after by media outlets. On March 12, 2001, on The Edge, Paula Zahn conducted a 10-minute interview with Greenwald. He also appeared on The O'Reilly Factor on October 10, 2002, when he was cross examined by host Bill O'Reilly for several minutes regarding the affair. In both interviews, Greenwald conceded that the New Square community probably voted overwhelmingly for Hillary Clinton in her race against Rick Lazio for U.S. Senate in 2000 with some expectation that some consideration be given to pardoning the members of the New Square community. However, he steadfastly maintained that there had been no quid pro quo or agreement to exchange votes for a pardon.

== Lithuanian Torah scrolls incident ==
Ronald Greenwald meeting with the President of Lithuania, Algirdas Brazouskas

Greenwald and others participating in the "funeral" of destroyed Torah scrolls in Lithuania

In September 1997, during a visit of scores of rabbis and other Orthodox Jews to Lithuania to commemorate the 200th anniversary of the death of the Vilna Gaon (Rabbi Eliyahu Kramer of Vilnius), Greenwald personally successfully negotiated with the Lithuanian government to allow the burial of several desecrated Torah scrolls.

The scrolls were among hundreds of Torah scrolls that had been disgraced by the Nazis and/or the Lithuanians during World War II. With the negotiated help of the government, Greenwald and others located over three hundred scrolls, including some that were being held in the basement of a church. They were able to salvage most of the scrolls for further use. The scrolls that could not be salvaged were buried in an elaborate ceremony attended by visiting Orthodox Jews from around the World and Lithuanian officials.

The day prior to the "funeral," Greenwald was invited to (and did) address the Lithuanian Parliament.

During the same visit, Greenwald intervened with the Prime Minister to prevent the desecration of the Jewish cemetery in Vilnius. The Lithuanian government was going to raze the cemetery and erect a shopping mall on the site. Greenwald contacted the Prime Minister's office and promised the Prime Minister that saving the cemetery would bring him great blessing. As Greenwald had previously interceded on Lithuania's behalf as it sought to enter NATO, his words carried strong influence with the Prime Minister and his request was heeded.

== Yitti Leibel Help Line tribute ==
Cover page of the Yitti Liebel Helpline 2009 Luncheon Journal

Journal ad honoring Greenwald

On November 15, 2009, The Yitti Liebel Help Line honored Greenwald by dedicating the event and the journal as a tribute to him. The journal cover page referred to him as a "champion of chessed" and as a "living, one man Chessed organization." The journal credited him with saving Jews from eastern Europe and Africa and proclaimed that "thousands of people owe more than they can ever repay to one hero - Ronnie!"

== Other activities ==
=== Bophuthatswana ===
Greenwald had a variety of unusual ties to South Africa in the Apartheid era. He was the diplomatic representative of the African Bantustan of Bophuthatswana in the United States, when that "homeland" lacked international recognition.

=== Schools and camps ===
When not engaged in high-stakes international diplomacy, Greenwald operated Camp Sternberg, a summer camp in the Catskill Mountains, which he founded in 1964 and ran Monsey Academy for Girls, a private high school in Rockland County, New York, of which he was the founder.

=== Involvement with charitable organizations ===
Greenwald served as chairman of the board of the Women's League in Rockland County (which creates and oversees adult group homes in that county) and of the Borough Park, Brooklyn branch of the Jewish Board of Family and Children's Services (JBFCS). He also served on the Board of Governors of the Orthodox Union, and as acting chairman of Magenu.

=== Greenwald and the Prince of Italy ===
Greenwald with Prince Emanuele Filiberto of Savoia

Greenwald worked with Prince Emanuele Filiberto of Italy in a variety of capacities. In January 2007, the two met in New York to discuss, among other things, a billion dollar Las Vegas hotel construction project being worked on by the "Made in Italy Group." (Both men serve the project in various capacities.) During the meeting, Prince Filiberto expressed regret for his great-grandfather Victor Emmanuel III's cooperation (albeit limited) with Adolf Hitler and the Nazis in their campaign of aggressive war and genocide against the Jews. He further reiterated his prior condemnation of those actions and expressed optimism regarding the present and future of Italian-Jewish relations.

== Other positions ==
Greenwald served as Chairman of the Board of the Women's League, once led by Rebetzin Perlow, the wife of Rabbi Yaakov Perlow, the Novominsker Rebbe. Greenwald has also held positions as:

- Executive Director of Yeshiva Toras Emes in Brooklyn, New York
- Director of the Jewish election campaign of former New York Governor Nelson Rockefeller
- Chaplain of the New York State Police
- Director of the Jewish presidential campaign of Richard Nixon
