= Disappearance of Inga Gehricke =

Inga Gehricke
- Born: 18 August 2009; Schönebeck, Germany
- Disappeared: 2 May 2015 (aged 5); Wilhelmshof (Stendal), Saxony-Anhalt, Germany
- Status: Missing for 11 years and 6 months

Inga Gehricke (born 18 August 2009) is a German missing person who, at the age of 5, disappeared at a family barbecue in Stendal (district), Saxony-Anhalt on 2 May 2015. As of 2026 Gehricke's whereabouts remain unknown.

== Background ==
Locations
1 Diakoniewerk Wilhelmshof - a woodland retreat (spiritual) owned by the church.

Logo of the Christian church organisation providing the woodland retreat Gehricke disappeared from.

Gehricke was born on 18 August 2009, in Schönebeck, Germany to Victoria and Jens-Uwe Gehricke. On 2 May 2015, Gehricke and her family planned to attend a barbecue at a friend's house 30 kilometers west of the town of Stendal, Germany. The house was located in a heavily wooded area in Diakoniewerk Wilhelmshof (a woodland retreat owned by the church), Stendal district. It contained a 100-meter footpath that led from the house to the edge of the forest where the barbecue was supposed to take place.

== Disappearance ==
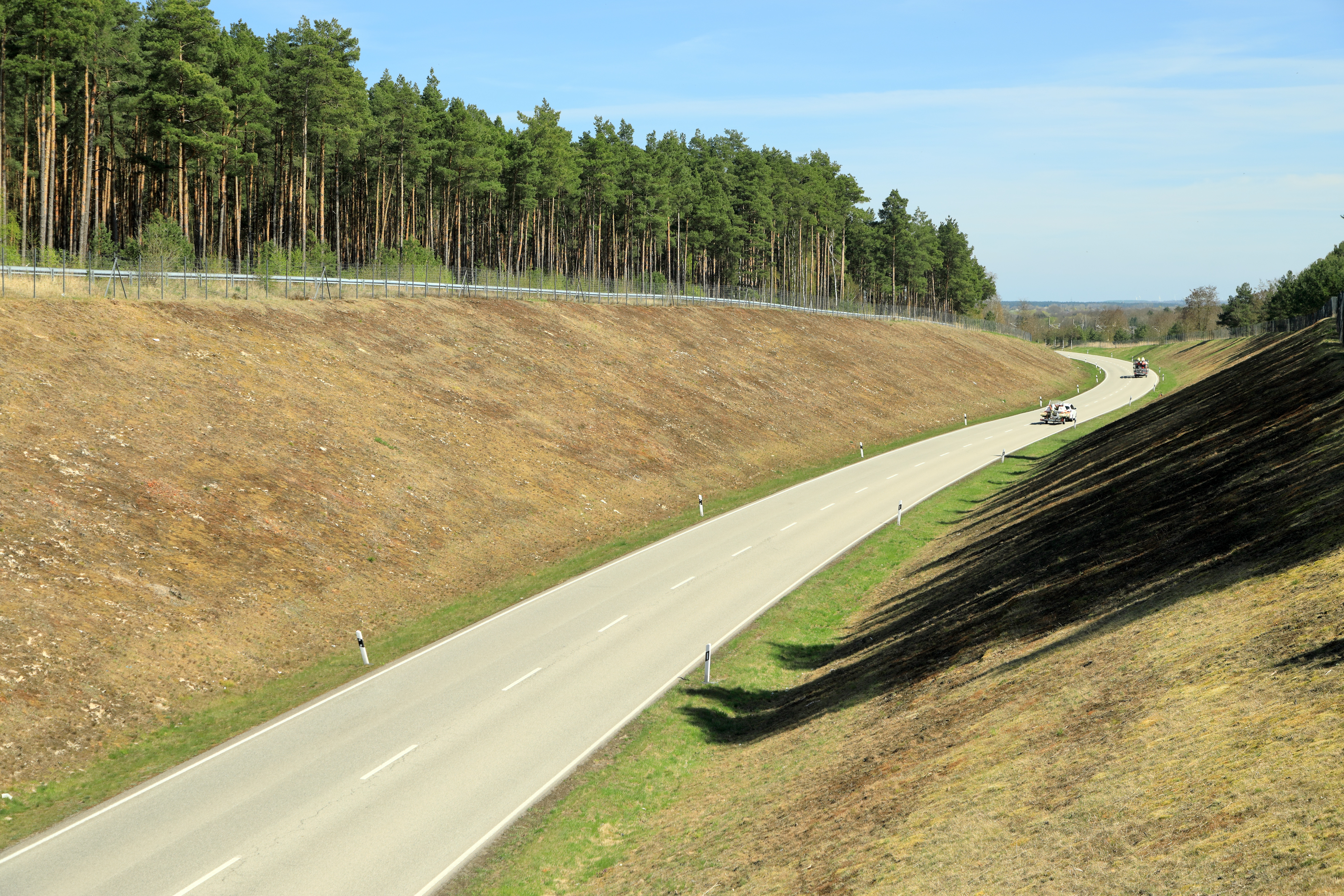
Nearby woods

On the evening of her disappearance Gehricke wanted to help her family and friends prepare for the barbecue. Her father saw her carrying two large water bottles on the property's footpath. Shortly afterwards, at 6:30, two children saw her making her way towards the house at the end of the footpath. She never arrived.

At 6:45, Gehricke's mother noticed that she was missing. She and the other attendees searched the property, and the adjacent forest, but were unable to find her. Thousands of volunteers, cadaver dogs, and helicopters with thermal imaging searched thousands hectares of land around the property, but were unsuccessful in locating her. Police did not initially suspect foul play in her disappearance. However, police later concluded that a crime had been committed after her whereabouts remained unknown by 7 May.

== Investigation ==
By 2019, no trace of Gehricke was found despite more than 2,000 tips and a 25,000 euro reward. Detectives officially closed the case later that year.

In 2020, German detectives investigating the disappearance of Madeleine McCann suspected that the prime suspect in her case may have also been responsible for Gehricke's disappearance. The man was living in Neuwegersleben 50 miles from where Gehricke was last seen. He had also been involved in a minor car accident in the area the day before Gehricke went missing. However, detectives ruled him out after cell phone records placed him far from the abduction site on the evening of her disappearance.

External videos
- Seit 10 Jahren vermisst - Das Rätsel um Inga

In 2023, detectives from Halle reopened her case. The following year, Gehricke's family collaborated with a beverage manufacturer who printed pictures of her on smoothie bottles in an attempt to generate new leads. The reward was also doubled to 50,000 euros. Despite more than 20 tips, and more than 30,000 bottles sold, Gehricke remained missing.

== See also ==
- List of people who disappeared mysteriously (2000–present)
