= Hermann Kreutzer =

German political activist (1924–2007)

- Born: 3 May 1924; Saalfeld, Germany
- Died: 3 March 2007 (aged 82); Berlin, Germany
- Occupations: Political activist Dissident and resistance activist (Nazi Germany and East Germany) "Häftlingsfreikauf" negotiator
- Political party: SPD
- Spouse: Dorothée "Dorle" Fischer
- Parent: Paul Kreutzer

Hermann Kreutzer (3 May 1924 – 3 March 2007) was a German political activist (SPD). As a teenager, he was caught distributing anti-government leaflets and spent the final months of the National Socialist period serving the first part of a ten year prison sentence. Towards the end of 1945 he entered mainstream politics in his home region, which was then being administered as part of the Soviet occupation zone. He campaigned against the party merger between the Communist Party and the Social Democratic Party. A further lengthy period in government detention followed. In 1956, following high level government negotiations, he was released and transferred from East to West Berlin.

He later came to the notice of commentators as one of the West German back-room negotiators involved in the "Häftlingsfreikauf" programme, which involved East German political prisoners being released to West Germany in return for large amounts of cash. When the programme began in 1962, it was a government secret on both sides of the border between the Germany. However, as more former East German political prisoners turned up in West Germany during the 1960s and 1970s, the realities of "Häftlingsfreikauf" became progressively a matter of public knowledge. By 1980, some of the complexities of Hermann Kreutzer's involvement in the programme were being openly discussed in the West German press.

== Biography ==
=== Provenance and early years ===
Hermann Kreutzer was born into a politicised family in Saalfeld, a small industrial town in Thuringia, south of Erfurt and Weimar. Paul Kreutzer, his father, worked as a carpenter and as a master-glazier, and was a committed member of the Social Democratic Party. When Hermann Kreutzer was aged 8 the Nazi Party took power and turned Germany into a one-party dictatorship. Any sort of anti-government political activity became illegal. As a teenager he took part in "leafleting actions", which involved distributing political material produced by or for the illegal SPD in Saalfeld.

=== The army ===
In 1942, Kreutzer was conscripted for military service and sent to serve in occupied France. Strongly opposed to Nazism, he was not a pacifist. He idolized King Frederick the Great. When he was injured, therefore, and was taken to a military hospital, he faced no questioning over the cause. Other sources recall that while serving in France Hermann Kreutzer secretly maintained contact with the résistance. In March 1945, still aged only 17, he was arrested by the authorities, found guilty of "Wehrkraftzersetzung" (undermining the war effort), and sentenced to a ten year jail term. In the chaos of the final months of the Second World War he managed to escape, managing to get a set of civilian clothes and a bicycle. He returned to Saalfeld in the company of United States forces. Interviewed a year before his death, Kreutzer would recall with satisfaction that he had managed to complete his escape and return home without a shot being fired. (Note: "Ich bin heute noch ganz stolz, dass kein Schuss gefallen ist.")

=== Time to rebuild ===
By 1945, the region surrounding Saalfeld had been liberated by United States 2nd Infantry Division. The US military administration and their British allies gave Kreutzer his first post-war assignment. He was allocated responsibility for managing food distribution in four districts. In July 1945, the area was handed over to the Soviet administration as agreed at the Yalta Conference. From October 1949, the area became part of the German Democratic Republic (East Germany). In July 1945, Kreutzer and his father, Paul, met Walter Ulbricht, who later, as General Secretary of the Socialist Unity Party, became East Germany's first leader. Ulbricht had returned to Germany from Moscow on 30 April 1945, with a group of other German exiles known as the Ulbricht Group. At their first meeting, Kreutzer and his father told Ulbricht of their plans to create a local League of Democratic Socialists. The Kreutzers were co-opted as members of the Social Democratic Party regional executive. With others, they set up a Saalfeld branch of the party.

=== Political tensions in the Soviet occupation zone ===
Relations between the Kreutzers and the emerging Soviet-style communist establishment quickly deteriorated. The push for an unequal political merger between Communists and Social Democrats was already on display. Discussions were sometimes heated. In his 2006 interview, Kreutzer would recall receiving a friendly warning from another future East German leader at a Youth Seminar in Camburg. Erich Honecker of the Free German Youth told him, "If you carry on like this, you'll end up back in the jail". (Note: "Wenn du so weiter machst, landest du wieder im Zuchthaus.") At the start of April 1946, Hermann Kreutzer and his father cycled over to Weimar in response to an invitation they had received to attend a lunch with other prominent politicians and activists. The invitation came from the Soviet military administrators in the region: lunch was to be served in the "officers' casino" at the Hotel Empress Augusta. The "Socis" (Social Democrats) were to sit along one side of it and the "Komiks" (comedians, as, among themselves, they called the Communists) were to sit along the other side. An unexpected feature of the way in which the room had been prepared had involved the positioning of a second chair behind each of the chairs set in place for the diners. When the guests sat down to eat, each man found himself with a Soviet officer sitting directly behind him. After the meal, the acting regional president of the Social Democrats, Heinrich Hoffmann, proposed a toast. He cited a rich tradition of pioneering Social Democratic progress in the Thuringia region, dating back to 1869. In light of this, it was no more than his duty to be the first, here in Thuringia, to "proclaim the unity" (between Communists and Social Democrats). For Kreutzer and other Social Democrats present, Hoffman's action was an appalling betrayal, but as soon as Hoffmann sat down the Soviet general next to him stood up: "We wish to toast the unity". Several Social Democrats began to protest, but behind each of them a Soviet officer came to life and ordered them to "say nothing". On the other side of the table the communist lunch guests now stood up, as one, and sang a verse extolling party unity from the song (originally a poem by the revolutionary poet Leonid Petrowitsch Radin), "Brothers, towards the sunshine, towards freedom". As far as Thuringia was concerned, the formal unification of the Communist Party and the Social Democratic Party was enacted at nearby Gotha on 7 April 1946. Accordingly, the political unification did take place a couple of weeks earlier in Thuringia than in the rest of the Soviet occupation zone. "Nationally", the contentious merger took place at a special congress convened in Berlin on 21 April 1946.

On 1 May 1946, Hermann Kreutzer and Dorothée "Dorle" Fischer attended the first political rally in Saalfeld of the new Socialist Unity Party ("Sozialistische Einheitspartei Deutschlands" / SED) in the main square at Saalfeld. The two of them had been friends since before the memorable occasion in 1933 when, aged 9 and 10, they had celebrated Hitler's successes by together discovering Kreutzer's uncle's wine collection. As the meeting in the square progressed, Dorle suggested the two of them should leave in case events turned ugly. But Kreutzer's opposition to National Socialism would never translate into opposition to military values of honour, courage and loyalty. He was loyal to the Social Democratic Party. So at night, with others, he now began to make his way through the streets of the town, sticking to the walls posters condemning the merger of the Communist and Social Democratic parties. He would pass information about the party merger and the arrests being made in order to enforce it through the still porous border West Berlin-based press contacts. He argued openly with the SPD regional party president, Heinrich Hoffmann, who had endorsed the merger. Kreutzer also maintained contacts from his Saalfeld home-base with the so-called SPD East Offices in West Berlin and Hanover, set up by leaders of the forcibly merged SPD from the Soviet occupation zone, who moved to the west because they wanted no part in the merger. The only place in the whole of Germany where it had been possible to hold a genuine member's vote among SPD members about the proposed party merger had been in West Berlin, where the idea was rejected by 82% of those voting.)

=== Arrest, trial and conviction ===
When Kreutzer was arrested again, on 4 April 1949, he was not totally surprised. This time it was not the Gestapo arresting him but the Russian secret police. He was detained at Weimar, as before identified as a political prisoner. Interrogation sessions involved beatings, immersion in cold water and sleep deprivation. Fairly soon, Kreutzer reached the point at which he would "sign anything". On 31 August, with his father, his fiancée (who had been working as a typist for the town council) and three other Social Democrat activists, he faced a Soviet military tribunal which was persuaded of his guilt in respect of "anti-Soviet propaganda", "counter-revolutionary activities" and "socialist breach of faith. The military tribunal sentenced Hermann Kreutzer, his father Paul Kreutzer, and his future wife Dorothée to twenty-five years of imprisonment and, according to some sources, forced labour apiece.

Dorothée was taken to NKVD special camp Nr. 7, the former Sachsenhausen concentration camp, on the outskirts of Berlin. She was later transferred to Hoheneck women's prison in Saxony. After a brief stay at Brandenburg-Görden Prison, Kreutzer and his father were taken to the overcrowded correctional facility at Bautzen. A large hall intended to accommodate 200 inmates accommodated 400 with nothing to do except sit and, in winter time, freeze. Contact with Dorothée at Sachsenhausen was out of the question. Starvation was everywhere and tuberculosis was rampant. There were no doctors and no drugs. Dead bodies were removed just once per day, directly after the roll call was taken. On one occasion, when Kreutzer was assigned to a team digging a mass grave, they had to stop and dig a new pit in another part of the ground after reaching a large pile of bones from a previous interment.

=== Release and expulsion ===
Kreutzer and his father did not, in the end, serve out their full twenty-five year sentences. In part, they were beneficiaries of the so-called Khrushchev Thaw. More directly, according to one source, they benefitted from the intervention of a senior British politician. In the years directly following the war, and on account of the still significant international presence of the residual British empire, British politicians at that time enjoyed significant prestige and influence across Europe. First Secretary Nikita Khrushchev of the Soviet Union visited London in April 1956. Possibly through the British connections of Kreutzer's friend Walter Kaack, the Labour Party leader, Hugh Gaitskell, had become aware of the predicament of his fellow social-democrat, Hermann Kreutzer, and found an opportunity to intercede with the Soviet leader on Kreutzer's behalf. On 31 May 1956, Hermann and Paul Kreutzer were released from the Bautzen penitentiary, and quietly removed to West Berlin. In the end, there was nothing particularly quiet about the press conference Kreutzer called in West Berlin in order to demand that Dorothée should also be released. He threatened to cross back into East Berlin and demand to be re-arrested if his fiancée had not been released by the end of July. His willingness to carry out the threat was never tested. Behind the scenes other international pressure was also being applied. Early on the morning of 31 July 1949, Dorothée was removed from her prison and placed on a train to the border by the People's Police. It was still only 8 in the morning when she appeared at the door of the house in West Berlin in which Kereutzer was staying. In October 1956, Hermann Kreutzer and Dorothée Fischer were married.

In West Berlin, Hermann Kreutzer immediately returned to politics, now with the West German SPD. For many years, he chaired the local party in Berlin-Tempelhof, also serving there as a local councillor and, later, as the Tempelhof local councillor with responsibility for social affairs.

=== Ministry for All-German Affairs / Intra-German Relations ===
In 1967, at the instigation of the Minister for All-German Affairs renamed in 1969 as the Ministry for Intra-German Relations, Herbert Wehner, Kreutzer switched to national politics, accepting a position as ministerial director in Wehner's ministry. The ministry's responsibilities and priorities changed over time, but its essential focus was on the endlessly changeable, complex and sensitive relationship between the government's West and East Germany. Kreutzer was given charge of administering the so-called "Häftlingsfreikauf" programme, which involved East German political prisoners being released to West Germany in return for large amounts of cash. The existence of the programme was not publicised at the time and it remained unacknowledged throughout and (less effectively) beyond the 1970s: most of the available information on its operation emerged only later. Kreutzer remained at the ministry after the coalition government fell in 1979, to be replaced by an SPD/FDP coalition government under Willy Brandt. Kreutzer's new ministerial boss was Egon Franke. It becomes clear that after 1979 Kreutzer quickly became disenchanted with the new West German government's more conciliatory approach to relations with the East German authorities, however. Between 1970 and 1980 Hermann Kreutzer sometimes deputised for Egon Bahr at meetings. The meetings involved were of a diplomatic nature and details of Kreutzer's involvement remain unknown. Bahr took the lead on behalf of Willy Brandt's government in negotiating a succession of treaties intended to regularise West Germany's relationships with governments to the east. They included the Treaties of Moscow and Warsaw (1970), the so-called Transit Treaty (1972) which secured the right of West Berliners to visit East Berlin and (under a much more restrictive set of conditions) of East Berliners to visit West Berlin. A particularly important treaty negotiated by Bahr and his team was the so-called Basic Treaty (1972).

=== Kurt Schumacher Circle ===
In 1968 Hermann Kreuzer founded the "Kurt Schumacher Circle", named after the former (western) SPD leader Kurt Schumacher. This was an organisation comprising people who had been locked up by the East German authorities and / or who had escaped / deserted from East Germany to West Germany since 1949. Kreuzer himself became the principal spokesman of the "Kurt Schumacher Circle". An important concern which Kreutzer was keen to bring to the attention of the SPD party leadership was the risk of the party becoming infiltrated by younger leftwingers who were controlled by, or at least sympathetic to the political objectives of, the government of East Germany.

=== Party tensions ===
In April 1979 Hermann Kreutzer went public with his belief that West Germany was playing host to between 10,000 and 12,000 people whom he identified as "agents of influence" ("Einflussagenten"), operating on behalf of the East German ruling party and occupying positions that enabled them to affect West German decision makers, notably within the SPD, the trades unions and the churches. Kreutzer believed that the entire affair was being orchestrated by Herbert Häber, an East German Central Committee member with responsibility for the west (which meant West Germany). When he went on to identify certain parliamentarians as "agents of influence", formal "Administrative Oversight Complaints" ("Dienstaufsichtsbeschwerde") were lodged against him at the Ministry for Intra-German Relations, in which at this stage he was still employed. The matter escalated. A party exclusion commission produced conclusions against Kreutzer which one source, unpersuaded by his allegations, identified as unexpectedly lenient. Although Kreutzer himself showed little appetite for downplaying the whole business, there were those in positions of influence within the party who were keen to avoid making a political martyr of Kreutzer among people who believed that he was almost certainly correct - in general terms if not in every precise details - about East German attempts to influence opinion in West Germany. During 1980 Kreutzer went public and personal with criticisms of party leader, ex-chancellor Brandt whose policy towards East Germany Ostpolitik he thought at best naïf. Shortly after this, Hermann Kreutzer was operationally retired ("dienstlich in den Ruhestand versetzt"). Shortly before the 1980 general election Hermann Kreutzer made a public appeal to voters to back the opposition CDU (party) with their votes. Sources differ over whether at this point he was expelled from the SPD or whether he anticipated expulsion by resigning his membership.

=== Later years ===
Although 1980 marked an end to his involvement with the SPD, Kreutzer remained politically engaged. He re-organised the Kurt Schumacher Circle which now became part of the "Gesellschaft für soziale Demokratie e. V." ("Society for Social Democracy") which had been founded in 1982. Its membership was composed mostly of former SPD members who in the past had been part of the party's right wing, many of them supporters of Fritz Erler. An enduring theme remained opposition to the East German ruling SED (party). After the changes and reunification in 1990 the SED scrambled to reinvent itself for a democratic future, relaunching itself as the Party of Democratic Socialism (PDS). Long before 1990, Kreutzer was researching and recording the East German regime's crimes. After 1990 he remained unpersuaded that the party could have changed fundamentally.

During the 1990s and on through the new century Hermann Kreutzer continued to deliver lectures on his experiences of the East German prison system. He also co-wrote a biography of Marlene Dietrich, which was published in 2001 in which he held out the singer-actress as a consistent and uncompromising opponent of National Socialism.
