= Wolf Heckmann =

German journalist (1929–2006)

- Born: 10 February 1929
- Died: 13 December 2006 (aged 77)
- Occupation: Journalist
- Spouse: Brigitte Klump (m. 1960; div. 1988)
- Children: 2

Wolf "Hecki" Heckmann (10 February 1929 – 13 December 2006) was a German journalist.

== Biography ==
Heckmann came to prominence in 1969 when he was appointed to edit the Hamburger Morgenpost, at that time a mass-market daily newspaper which had been founded ten years earlier by the powerful Hamburg branch of the Social Democratic Party (SPD). The newspaper market at the time was changing, however, as the relentless growth in circulation by less didactically political titles – headed up by Bild – challenged the various newspapers established by the SPD after the war. In 1972, after not quite three years, he resigned the editorship of Morgenpost amid recriminations about falling circulation, missed opportunities and ill-considered strategy. Afterwards Heckmann commented ruefully, "I had the feeling I was wading in thick mud". He returned to Morgenpost in 1989, working with Ernst Fischer as a member of the editorial team. Three years after that, when Fischer moved across to the Gruner + Jahr magazine, Stern, Heckmann resumed the post of managing editor, seventeen years after resigning from it. According to the newspaper's own assessment, During the dramatic political developments of the next year his astute political judgment provided an important element of level-headed reassurance to young colleagues. When he retired he was succeeded at Morgenpost by his deputy Manfred von Thien.

Other papers for which he wrote included the Abendzeitung, Bild and the Berliner Zeitung. He also worked as a translator and, briefly in 1983/84, as a film actor in Der Havarist.

Heckmann's 300 page biographical work on Erwin Rommel appeared in 1976 under the title "Rommels Krieg in Afrika". It can be seen as the first serious work published in German to deal critically with the military performance of the commander in chief of the Afrika Korps. According to a review in Der Spiegel, "after three decades of blind belief in Rommel from German – and even more from British – commentators, Heckmann is the first author thoroughly to get hold of the myth and understand why Rommel, during his life time and directly following his death, was greatly over-estimated".

In 1973 Heckmann flew alone in a Scheibe Falke (powered glider) from Rotenburg an der Wümme (between Bremen and Hamburg) to Perth in Western Australia. It took 230 hours and 34 minutes, establishing what sources describe as an "unofficial world record" in the process. He later wrote up the adventure in his book "Haie fressen keine Deutschen" ("Sharks don't eat Germans").

== Personal ==
Wolf Heckmann married the author Brigitte Klump in 1960. She had escaped from the east in 1957. The marriage produced one son and one daughter, the singer-composer Inga Heckmann, but ended in divorce in 1988.
