= Trading of East German political prisoners =

Clandestine deal between East and West Germany

Häftlingsfreikauf ("Prisoners' ransom") is the term used in Germany for an informal, and for many years, secret, series of transactions between the German Democratic Republic (East Germany) and the German Federal Republic (West Germany) between 1962 and 1989. Over this period nearly 34,000 East German political prisoners were "freigekauft" (ransomed). West Germany paid East Germany, generally in cash or goods, an average of approximately 40,000 Deutsche Marks per person. Political prisoners whose freedom had been purchased could choose to be expelled directly from their place of detention to West Germany, and frequently were given no notice or opportunity to communicate with their families, nor to say goodbye to fellow prisoners, before being transferred to the West.

The practice ended in October 1989 when remaining political prisoners began to be released in the context of the Peaceful Revolution and the rapid succession of changes that led, formally in October 1990, to German reunification. Between 1964 and October 1989, it is believed that 33,755 political prisoners had their freedom purchased for a nominal total price of 3.5 billion Deutsche Marks in terms of the equivent currency's modern purchasing power. In addition to the release of political prisoners, approximately 250,000 exit visas were purchased by West Germany on behalf of East Germans who wished to emigrate.

The cash payments helped support the economy of East Germany, which was in a state of permanent financial crisis from the 1970s until German reunification.

The Protestant Church's Stuttgart based social welfare organization Diakonie played a facilitating role in mediating the transactions. Close relations between the East and West German Protestant church communities were tolerated by East Germany's ruling SED (party).

== History ==
The first trade in political prisoners took place over Christmas 1962: 20 prisoners and the same number of children were released in return for a delivery of three rail wagons loaded with potash fertilisers. The West German Chancellor at the time was still Konrad Adenauer. Adenauer had faced a crisis within the governing coalition earlier in the month, which had resulted in the appointment on 14 December 1962 of Rainer Barzel as the Minister of Intra-German Relations.

Annual West German purchases of East German political prisoner releases (1963-1989)

The prisoner release transactions were negotiated informally at government level, initially as individual deals, and later according to a more consistently established set of processes. The average price per prisoner was around 40,000 Deutsche Marks per person at the outset, but may have reached 100,000 Deutsche Marks by the time the practice ended in 1989. Officially the payments represented "damages" for the harm the prisoners were alleged to have done in East Germany and to compensate the East German state for the loss of value from the cost of training invested in the individuals released to the west. This offered a semi-official justification for the payments.

In reality, the background was one in which the East German state was chronically short of cash in general, and of convertible currency in particular. The West German Deutsche Mark had become, by the early 1960s, a fully convertible currency. Selling political prisoners to the west addressed another problem for East Germany. The historian Stefan Wolle describes the arrangement as "a form of political toxic-waste disposal" ("eine Art politischer Giftmüllentsorgung"). The West German government was motivated, more simply, by humanitarian considerations.

The actual logistics of the prisoner transfers were implemented discreetly by the East German authorities. For example, two West German Magirus-Deutz buses were provided with "rotating number-plates". While travelling in East German territory, the buses displayed East German license plates (registration plates) in order to avoid standing out. At the press of a button, on crossing to the west, these were replaced with West German plates.

With Cold War tensions providing political context during the 1950s and early 1960s, the East German and West German governments both denied the existence of government contacts between the German states. In reality, the sale of the prisoner releases was negotiated, from the East German side, by a lawyer originally from Silesia called Wolfgang Vogel who evidently enjoyed the full confidence of the party leadership, but was also valued by the leadership in West Germany, described snappily on at least one occasion by Helmut Schmidt as "our mail man".

Vogel's West German negotiating partners were government lawyers such as Walter Priesnitz and Ludwig A. Rehlinger, along with senior politicians, including Herbert Wehner, Helmut Schmidt and Hans-Jochen Vogel. Another politician who became closely involved in front-line government-level negotiations, as the veil of secrecy began to wear thin, was Hermann Kreutzer, a formerly East German political activist who in 1949 had been imprisoned for openly opposing the contentious political merger that had led to the creation of East Germany's ruling SED (party). Kreutzer's 25-year sentence had been cut short in 1956, during the Khrushchev Thaw and following intense political pressure from West Germany, when he had been bundled across the border into West Berlin.

Ludwig Geißel of the Diakonie was also involved in purchasing the freedom of political prisoners, along with members and senior officers of the West Berlin City Council. Although the German governments attempted to keep the transactions secret, as more and more former detainees turned up in the west, awareness of the "Häftlingsfreikauf" programme seeped into public consciousness. In 1983 a scandal erupted in West Germany which threatened to undermine the humanitarian motives of West German governments. It was alleged that the long-standing, Minister of Intra-German Relations between 1969 and 1982 Egon Franke and a senior ministerial official, named Edgar Hirt, had presided over the questionable disappearance of 5.6 Million Deutsche Marks into East Germany. Both men were indicted. They stood trial at the end of 1986, during the run-up to a general election, for embezzlement and fraud in connection with the "Häftlingsfreikauf" programme. Franke was acquitted, but the court determined that Hirt had applied some of the "black funds" involved to non-humanitarian causes without the knowledge of his minister, and Hirt was sentenced to a three-and-a-half-year jail term.

== Criticism ==
As Häftlingsfreikäufe became known to the public, criticism of it surfaced in the west and, after 1989, across Germany. There were suggestions that it implied acceptance of the detention of political opponents, and that it provided a pressure valve that weakened political opposition to the East German leadership, thereby reducing pressure on the party hierarchy and underwriting Germany's second one-party dictatorship. There was a suspicion that it might give an incentive to the East German authorities to increase the number of political prisoners, seeing them as a source of potential income. For example, in 1979 the standard prison sentence for serious "Republikflucht" cases (of attempting to escape from the country) was increased from five to eight years.

An additional concern, from the western perspective, was that human rights organisations such as Amnesty International, which were better informed than most on the murky world of political prisoners in East Germany, were inhibited from campaigning against East Berlin's human rights abuses for fear of endangering the Häftlingsfreikäufe programme.

== Cost ==
Sources are not consistent over the total amount paid by West Germany for the release of East German political prisoners, and the issue is further complicated by changes in the value of money – even of the Deutsche Mark – between 1962 and 1989. Some data may conflate payments made under the Häftlingsfreikauf scheme with costs for the purchase of exit visas of approximately 250,000 East German citizens who were not political prisoners but nonetheless made a convincing case for wishing to leave East Germany. Estimates tended to increase over time, with one source, in 1994, suggesting that the total cost to West Germany of the Häftlingsfreikäufe programme might have been as high as 8 billion Deutsche Marks.
