= Detlef Kühn =

German commentator (born 1936)

- Born: 16 November 1936 (age 90); Potsdam, West Prussia, Brandenburg, Germany
- Education: Free University of Berlin
- Occupations: Politician; President of the Whole Germany Institute; Journalist; Genealogist
- Political party: FDP

Detlef Kühn (born 16 November 1936) is a German commentator. A qualified jurist, he is a former politician and broadcasting director. He is also noted as a genealogist.

Between 1972 and 1991 Kühn served as Chair of the Whole German Institute ("Bundesanstalt für gesamtdeutsche Aufgaben" / BfgA), an organisation sponsored by the West German government which promoted awareness of the shared cultural and linguistic roots of East and West Germany, and in retrospect can be seen to have kept alive the idea that German division, viewed almost universally as a permanent fixture through the 1970s and nearly all of the 1980s, might not be permanent after all. In practice the BfgA was a highly politicised institution: the choice of Kühn to lead it was endorsed by the duration of his incumbency. When the organisation was hit by a media storm in 1981 one caption writer described him in 1981 as "a lawyer with a heart" ("Jurist mit Herz").

== Life ==
=== Provenance and early years ===
Detlef Kühn was born in Potsdam not quite four years after the Nazis took power. His father was a private sector clerical worker who had moved to Potsdam from Riga after the First World War. His mother's family roots lay in East Prussia and Brandenburg, which has subsequently underpinned both his interest in the history of those regions and his increasingly public genealogical research. His early life and schooling took place in Potsdam, which after 1945 found itself administered as part of the Soviet occupation zone (relaunched in 1949 as the Soviet sponsored German Democratic Republic). As a child he reported to his parents that someone had asked him whether his family was protestant or catholic. "Just tell them we're believers in God" was the parental advice. In fact he had been baptised a protestant, but just a few months later, in 1937, his parents "left the church", taking their infant son with them. In 1952 the family relocated to West Berlin. A few years later it would have become difficult or impossible to move from East Germany to West Berlin in this way, but in the early 1950s the so-called Inner German border was still relatively porous, and many families made the move, exacerbating East Germany's desperate shortage of working-age population in the process. Kühn passed his school final exams (Abitur) in West Berlin in 1956 which opened the way to a university level education. He then moved on to the recently founded Free University of Berlin where he studied Jurisprudence. Money was tight, but he was able to fund his student years by working a tourist guide and as a postal worker.

=== Intra-German politics ===
He passed Part I of his national exams for Law in 1960 and Part II in 1965, supporting himself during this period as a legal clerk ("Rechtsreferendar"). In 1964 he joined the Free Democratic Party (FDP), a centre-right political party committed to economic and (sometimes less prominently) socially liberal ideals. At that time the FDP party leader, was pushing for better contacts between East and West Germans even though, at the time, the legitimacy of the East German state was not officially "recognised" by the government in the west. It was, for instance, during Mende's period as West German Vice-Chancellor that West Berliners were permitted, for the first time, to cross the Wall for Christmas visits in December 1963. From 1964, East German senior citizens were allowed to visit West Germany. The political division of Germany was a matter with which Detlef Kühn was passionately concerned, and became core to his professional career. In the 1965 General Election the FDP won 9.5% of the national vote and prepared to rejoin the governing coalition as a junior partner. The FDP group in the Bundestag (national parliament) identified a critical vacancy for a lawyer to work as a parliamentary research assistant and offered Kühn the job. In a discussion the newly elected leader of the FDP group in the Bundestag, Hans-Dietrich Genscher, who would become an important political ally, urged him to accept. Kühn did so, and in 1966 moved with his new wife from West Berlin to Bonn (officially the "provisional capital of West Germany") to take up his duties.

His work for the FDP parliamentary covered foreign affairs, Germany (i.e. East Germany) policy and security matters. That provided the framework for his political involvement. The 1969 general election was the prelude to a political reconfiguration which saw the FDP enter government as the junior partner in a coalition government led by Willy Brandt of the SPD. Hans-Dietrich Genscher went to the Interior Ministry. Detlef Kühn went with him. His day-to-day ministerial contact during this period was Günter Hartkopf, the secretary of state. Kühn would later look back on these two years as a vital apprenticeship in government administration. He combined this work with a role as chair of the FDP group in Bonn. Party colleagues were appreciative of the part he played in securing excellent national results in the elections of 1965 and 1969 and there was a widespread assumption that he would himself become a member of the Bundestag. That never happened, however. The FDP was itself a sometimes lumpy coalition between economic liberals and social liberals, and during the 1960s it was the social liberals who called the shots at the national delegate conference selecting parliamentary candidates. This faction did not share Detlef Kühn's supportive attitude to Erich Mende, by now seen a liberal leader from and for an earlier generation. Kühn they cold shouldered.

Instead, with the support of Hans-Dietrich Genscher who had apparently by now become an indispensable member of the government, Detlef Kühn succeeded to the presidency of the Whole Germany Institute ("Bundesanstalt für gesamtdeutsche Aufgaben" / BfgA). He succeeded Ludwig A. Rehlinger who was out of sympathy with the controversial Ostpolitik ("East [Germany] policy") being pursued by the Brandt government. Kühn remained in the job, which defined his career, for a remarkable seventeen years, stepping down only after reunification made the BfgA politically redundant.

The BfgA job meant working closely with the West German Minister of Intra-German Relations. Kühn worked successively with the Social Democrat Egon Franke and with the Christian Democrats Rainer Barzel, Heinrich Windelen and Dorothee Wilms who courageously offered all European governments a right of veto over reunification. None took up the offer, which accordingly probably meant that the process was able to progress faster and more smoothly than would otherwise have been the case. The BfgA was abolished on 31 December 1991.

=== After 1990 ===
With the BfgA now surplus to requirements, Kühn's career took a new direction. He identified a desperate lack of experience and expertise in running free media operations in the "new federal states" (former East Germany) and moved to Leipzig, the largest city and a cultural capital of Saxony where he took on the Administration and Broadcasting directorship[ at Saxony Radio which had taken over the bandwidths formerly occupied by Radio DDR 2. In 1992, when Saxony Radio was subsumed into Central Germany Broadcasting ("Mitteldeutscher Rundfunk" / MDR), Kühn responded the call from the CDU politician (and former civil rights activist) de:Arnold VaatzArnold Vaatz to create, in Dresden, a statewide broadcasting facility to support private broadcasters. It quickly became apparent that this arrangement was opposed by Saxony's western born Minister-president Kurt Biedenkopf, who had very clear ideas of his own about an alternative broadcasting hub for Dresden. After seven years Kühn was obliged to abandon the project, but not before he had been able to have a significant influence on the "broadcasting landscape" in Saxony.

=== Beyond politics ===
In 1974 he was one of the eight co-founders of the German Cancer Aid ("Stiftung Deutsche Krebshilfe") foundation.

In recent years he has contributed extensively on political topics in the weekly newspaper Junge Freiheit.

For decades Detlef Kühn has also pursued genealogical research, principally on Baltic region genealogy.
