= Ludwig A. Rehlinger =

German jurist (1927–2023)

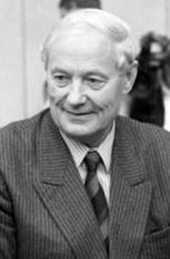
- Rehlinger in 1988
- Born: 23 September 1927; Berlin, Germany
- Died: 28 March 2023 (aged 95)
- Occupations: Jurist; Government official Berlin politician

Ludwig A. Rehlinger (23 September 1927 – 28 March 2023) was a German jurist who became a senior West German government official ("secretary of state"). He came to wider prominence in connection with the trading of East German political prisoners.

== Biography ==
Rehlinger was born and attended school in Berlin. As a child he used to visit his grandparents who lived at Erkner, outside the city on its eastern side, where he learned to love the forests by the Dämeritzsee (lake). Although he was only 17 when the Second World War ended, he had already by that stage been conscripted into the army, ending up detained by the British as a prisoner of war. He was able to commence his university studies in Law at the Humboldt University in Berlin in 1947, later transferring to the Free University of Berlin.

Between 1957 and 1969 Rehlinger worked as a ministerial official in the West German Ministry of "All-Germany Questions" (renamed after 1969 as the "Bundesministerium für innerdeutsche Beziehungen"), serving successively under Jakob Kaiser, Ernst Lemmer and, during an important period from December 1962 till October 1963, Rainer Barzel. The ministry was especially sensitive because it was central in the relationship between West and East Germany, including so-called "political questions" and "security responsibilities". It was while he was at the ministry that the practice began whereby the West German government paid the East German government for the release of political prisoners, under a scheme which came to be known as "Häftlingsfreikauf". Although something similar had previously taken place involving the churches, direct government involvement in the practice first occurred in December 1962 when twenty East German prisoners and the same number of children were released in return for a delivery from the west of three rail wagons loaded with potash fertilisers. A pattern quickly emerged, driven from the western side by humanitarian motives and from the east by a desperate shortage of basic supplies and convertible currency.

The initial transaction came two weeks after the appointment on 14 December 1962 of the lawyer-politician Rainer Barzel as the Minister of Intra-German Relations. Its subsequent implementation was headed up by ministerial officials with legal training, although senior politicians continued to take a keen interest in the west and, it is assumed, the east. At a more detailed level, the pattern that emerged involved regular and intense negotiations between Ludwig Rehlinger from the west and the negotiator-lawyer Wolfgang Vogel on behalf of the east. The unenviable responsibility for determining which political prisoners should have their freedom purchased fell to Rehlinger, using lists of known detainees, together with personal files of available information, supplied by three lawyers. Rehlinger then applied criteria of his own devising, including length of sentence, health status and family relationships. Once Rehlinger and Vogel had concluded their negotiations, the agreed releases almost always took place as agreed between the two of them, although it became apparent that the agreements were subsequently vetted at a high level within the Party Central Committee in East Berlin. The Häftlingsfreikauf programme gradually became public knowledge, and after 1989 was widely discussed, but during the early years it was regarded as highly secret because of the political sensitivities involved on all sides. The influential news publisher Axel Springer was involved from the outset, and Rehlinger made it his business to inform the principal newspaper editors personally of what was happening, while stressing that Häftlingsfreikauf would immediately have to be suspended if they were to publish hints or reports of it.

The General election of September 1969 saw the ruling centre-right unionist parties with their electoral support virtually unchanged, but following negotiations involving key leaders in the SPD and FDP parties, which had respectively come second and third in the polls, resulted in a change of government. The new government was dominated by the SPD and led by Willy Brandt, a man whose opinions on a range of matters were never left in doubt for long. It was immediately clear that Brandt would attempt to follow a far more emollient strategy in terms of relations between East and West Germany. Rehlinger was a ministerial official and not a politician, but he had nevertheless worked in a high-level job in a politically sensitive ministry under a government that, formally, had not even acknowledged the existence of a separate East German state. He was out of sympathy with the Brandt approach and late in 1969 left his job with the ministry. In the meantime, between July 1969 and March 1972, Ludwig Rehlinger served as president of the Bundesanstalt für gesamtdeutsche Aufgaben (BfgA / Whole Germany Tasks Institute), an institution created by the government for educational purposes and, more generally, for information gathering, evaluation and dissemination, to be supervised by the Ministry for which, in July, Rehlinger was still working.

Ludwig Rehlinger was not alone in his dismay at the Ostpolitik strategy of the Brandt government. Several Bundestag members switched their support away from the SPD and FDP parties, in favour of the centre right CDU/CSU opposition. There was a move to have Rehlinger's old boss, Rainer Barzel, elected as Chancellor in succession to Willy Brandt. Rehlinger was given leave of absence from his work with the Gesamtdeutsche Institut in order to serve as Barzel's campaign manager. In the event, Barzel's candidacy was scuppered because the necessary vote of no confidence was unexpectedly lost by two votes: Chancellor Brandt survived in office and his treaty with East Germany was ratified. The result achieved added poignancy 25 years later when, in 1997, longstanding rumours were confirmed that two Bundestag members, Julius Steiner and Leo Wagner had each accepted 50,000 Mark bribes from the East German Ministry for State Security to vote against their own parties and in favour of Brandt's SPD. After the failure of Barzel's campaign for the chancellorship Rehlinger's leave of absence from the Gesamtdeutsche Institut became permanent, and its work was taken forward, in a transformed political context, under the presidency of Detlef Kühn.

In 1975 Rehlinger took a private sector job as a chief executive. He returned to government service in 1982, again taking a job as a ministerial official in the Ministry of Intra-German Relations, which was in fact his old ministry but with a new title (and a greatly modified mandate). His job title was now Secretary of State, which under the German system denotes a top civil service position (equivalent to a "permanent secretary" in the British system). Rehlinger was by now closely identified with his former boss, Rainer Barzel, and his return to government service coincided with the election success of Helmut Kohl and a resulting restitution of a CDU led governing coalition. He retired from the ministry in 1988. During his final six years he resumed his earlier responsibilities for negotiating "Häftlingsfreikauf" exchanges with East German counterparts, concentrating in particular on reuniting divided families: it is believed that he was able to purchase the release from East Germany to the west of around 2,000 East Germans who had lost their parents after the erection of the Berlin Wall, when escaping parents had been obliged to leave their children behind.

Between May 1988 and March 1989 Rehlinger served briefly as a Berlin senator, with responsibility for the administration of justice, stepping into the shoes of Rupert Scholz who in May 1988 had found himself unexpectedly parachuted into national politics with an appointment as Minister of Defence.

Between 2005 and 2007 he served as chairman of the Deutsche Gesellschaft, a body created "to promote political, cultural and social relations in Europe". Since 2007 he has been its honorary chairman.

Rehlinger died on 28 March 2023, at the age of 95.
