= Peter Schowtka =

German politician (1945–2022)

- Pětr Šołtka
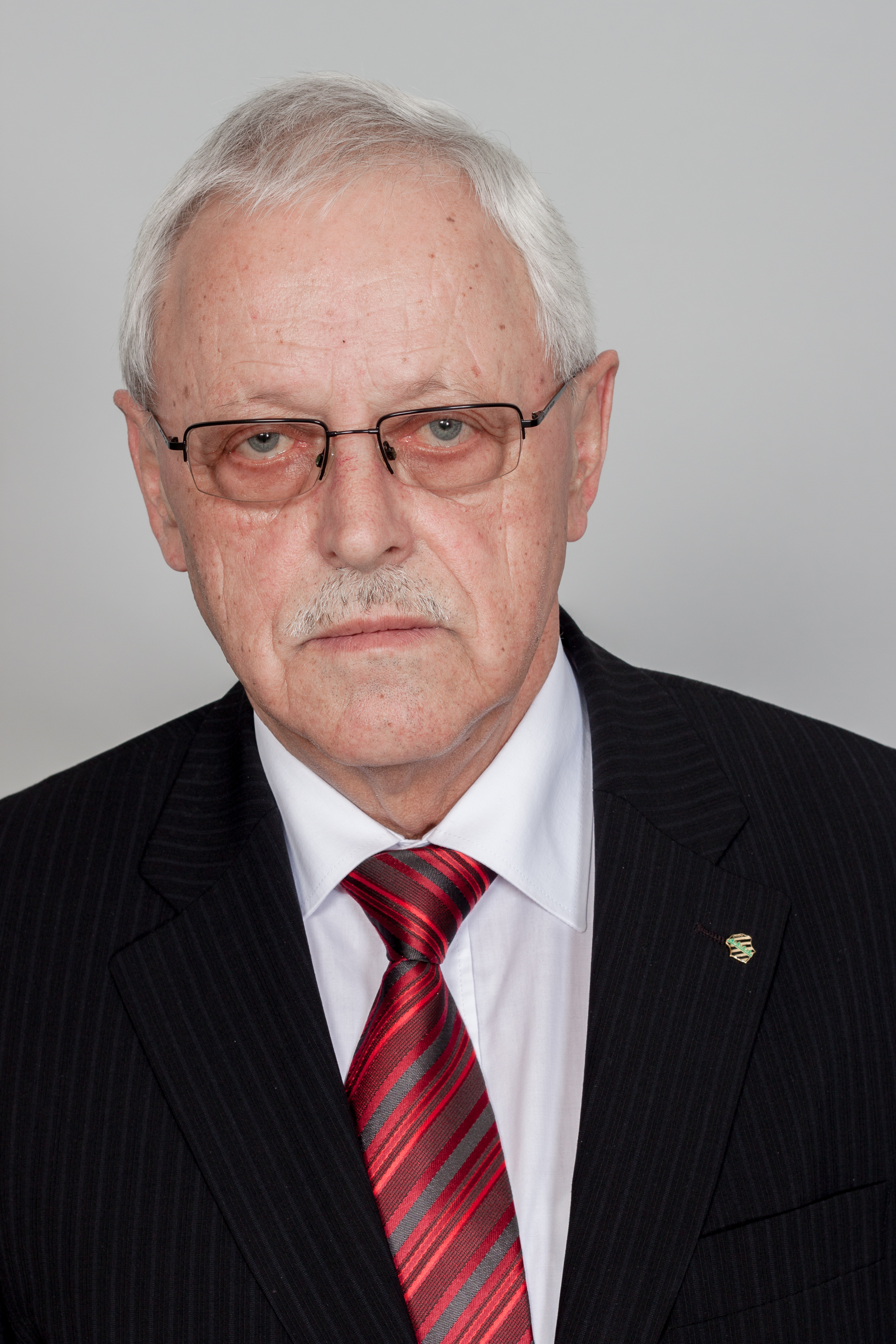
- Schowtka in 2013

Member of the Landtag of Saxony
- In office November 1991 – 31 August 2014
- Preceded by: Karl Sachse
- Succeeded by: Constituency disestablished
- Constituency: Niederschlesische Oberlausitz 2 constituency (1999–2014); Party list (1991–1999)

Mayor of Wittichenau
- In office 1990–1994
- Preceded by: Office re-established
- Succeeded by: Udo Popella

Personal details
- Born: 7 January 1945 Wittichenau, Saxony, Germany
- Died: 5 August 2022 (aged 77)
- Party: Christian Democratic Union (1989–2022)
- Other political affiliations: Independent (until 1989)
- Children: 1
- Education: University of Rostock
- Awards: Saxon Constitutional Medal

Peter Georg Schowtka (Upper Sorbian: Pětr Jurij Šołtka, pronounced [ˈpʲɪtʁ ˈjuʁʲij ˈʃɔwtka]; 7 January 1945 – 5 August 2022) was a German politician who served as a member of the Landtag of Saxony from 1991 to 2014. Schowtka was an ethnic Sorb.

== Early life and education ==
Schowtka was born on 7 January 1945 in the town of Wittichenau in Saxony, then part of Nazi Germany. Six months after his birth, Schowtka's father was kidnapped by the Soviet occupation force and taken to the NKVD Special Camp No. 1 in Mühlberg, where he was killed in 1947. Schowtka was a Roman Catholic of Sorb ethnicity.

Schowtka grew up in East Germany. From 1961 to 1964, he received vocational training as a concrete worker. Schowtka attended the University of Rostock from 1964 until 1969, where he studied Latin American studies. However, Schowtka was denied a diploma due to his "lack of socio-political maturity".

== Career ==
From 1969 until 1990, Schowtka worked as an economist, and he later served as an interpreter for foreigners working in lignite mines in Mozambique.

In 1989, Schowtka joined the Christian Democratic Union. He had previously been an independent. From 1991 until his death in 2022, Schowtka served as a member of the CDU's executive committee in Saxony. Schowtka helped establish a CDU educational institute for local government in Saxony. He also negotiated a sister city partnership between Wittichenau and the town of Bad Honnef in North Rhine-Westphalia.

In 1990, upon German reunification, Schowtka was elected mayor of Wittichenau, the first person freely elected to that office in 57 years. The next year, Schowtka became a member of the Landtag of Saxony following the resignation of Karl Sachse; Schowtka was to fill the remainder of Sachse's term. In the 1994 Saxony state election, Schowtka was elected via party list for a full term in the Landtag, and he resigned as mayor. In the 1999 Saxony state election, Schowtka was re-elected to represent the Niederschlesische Oberlausitz 2 constituency (Lower Silesian Upper Lusatia constituency 2). Schowtka was re-elected in 2004 and 2009. He did not run for re-election in the 2014 Saxony state election.

While in the state parliament, Schowtka served on several parliamentary committees, including the Home Affairs Committee and the Constitutional, Legal and European Committee. He was also a member of a committee established to investigate the National Socialist Underground, a neo-Nazi terrorist group.

In 2016, Schowtka received the Saxon Constitutional Medal. Schowtka was married and had one child. He died on 5 August 2022 at the age of 77.
