= Hamburger Morgenpost =

German newspaper

Hamburger Morgenpost Hamburger Morgenpost am Sonntag

- The 29 January 2011 front page of the Hamburger Morgenpost
- Type: Daily newspaper (Sunday own title)
- Format: Tabloid
- Owner(s): M. DuMont Schauberg
- Editor-in-chief: Frank Niggemeier
- Founded: Hamburg 1949
- Language: German
- Headquarters: Hamburg
- Circulation: 115,845 (Quarter 2, 2009)
- OCLC number: 85349630
- Website: www.mopo.de

The Hamburger Morgenpost (Hamburg Morning Post) (also known as Mopo) is a daily German newspaper published in Hamburg in tabloid format.

As of 2006 the Hamburger Morgenpost was the second-largest newspaper in Hamburg after Bild Zeitung.

== History and profile ==
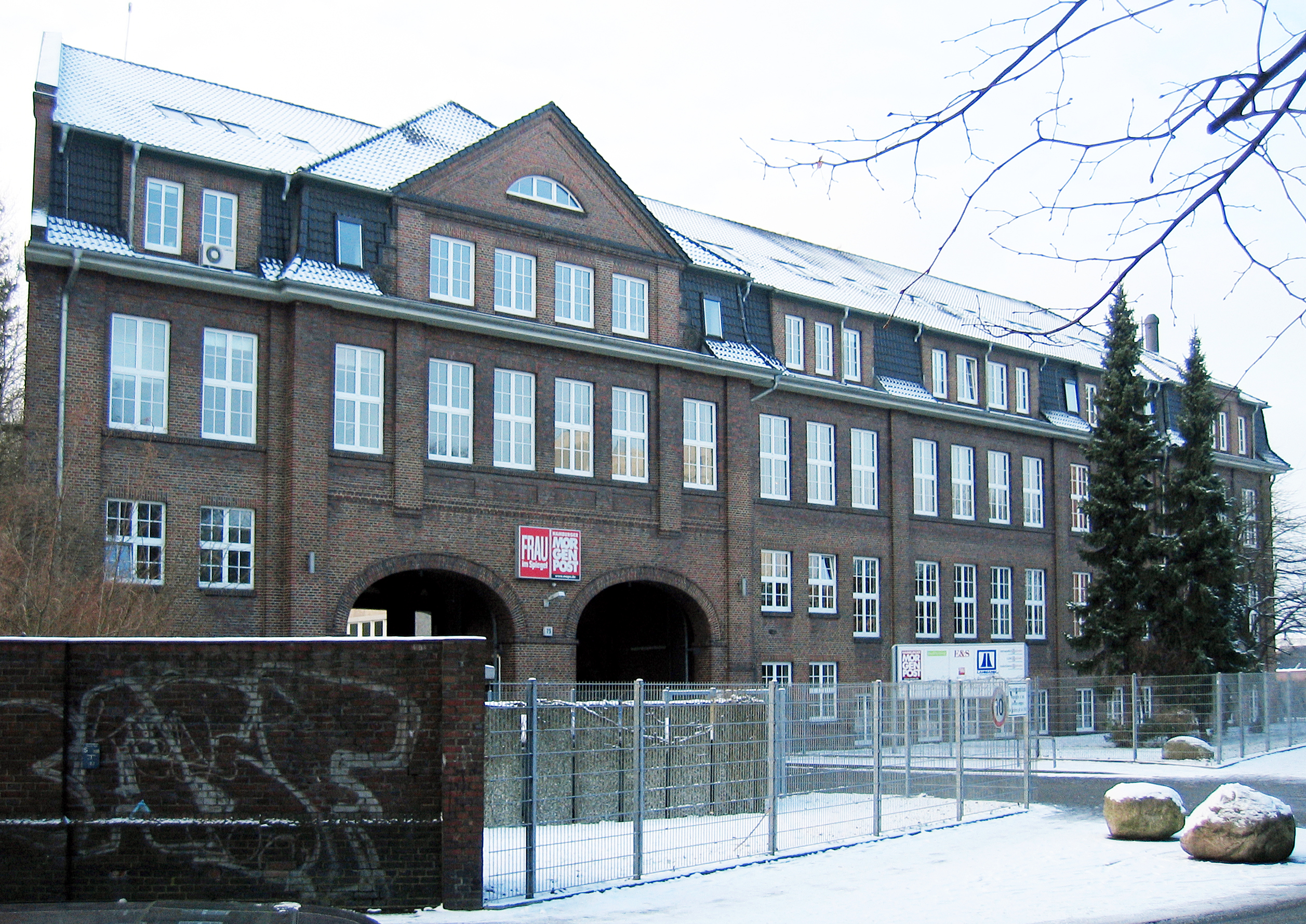
Building of the publishing company in Bahrenfeld in 2005

The Hamburger Morgenpost was founded in 1949 by the Hamburg section of the Social Democratic Party (SPD) with a circulation of 6,000 copies. Until the late 1950s, the circulation increased to 450,000 copies. When Bild Zeitung was brought out by the Axel Springer publishing house as a second tabloid serving Hamburg, the circulation of the Hamburger Morgenpost declined steadily. Due to the existing competition with other newspapers, such as the 1948 re-founded Hamburger Abendblatt, there was a decline in interest in political party-owned newspapers in Hamburg. The SPD sold the newspaper following financial problems in the mid-1970s. After having several owners, the Gruner + Jahr publishing company bought it in 1986. In 1989, its circulation had fallen to 135,000. In 1999, Gruner + Jahr sold the newspaper in to Frank Otto and Hans Barlach. In 2006, the BV Deutsche Zeitungsholding, a company of David Montgomery's Mecom Group and Veronis Suhler Stevenson International, bought the newspaper. In 2009, Mecom Group sold it to the Cologne-based private publishing company DuMont Schauberg.

The circulation of the Hamburger Morgenpost was 115,845 copies in the second quarter of 2009.

== Editors-in-chief ==
- 1985–1986: Nils von der Heyde
- 1986: Jürgen Juckel
- 1986–1989: Wolfgang Clement
- 1989–1992: Ernst Fischer
- 1992–1994: Wolf Heckmann
- 1994–1996: Manfred von Thien
- 1996–1998: Mathias Döpfner
- 1998–2000: Marion Horn
- 2000–2006: Josef Depenbrock
- 2006–2008: Matthias Onken
- 2008–2020: Frank Niggemeier
- since 2020: Maik Koltermann

== 2015 arson ==
The front cover of the Hamburger Morgenpost on 8 January 2015, in which satirical Charlie Hebdo images were re-published with the title "This much freedom must be possible!"

In response to the terrorist attack on Charlie Hebdo in which 12 people died on 7 January 2015, some international organizations such as Reporters Without Borders called for controversial Charlie Hebdo cartoons to be re-published in solidarity with the French satirical magazine and in defense of free speech. The Hamburger Morgenpost included Charlie Hebdo cartoons on its front cover on January 8 and other publications such as Germany's Berliner Kurier and Poland's Gazeta Wyborcza reprinted cartoons from Charlie Hebdo the day after the attack; the former depicted Muhammad reading Charlie Hebdo whilst bathing in blood. At least three Danish newspapers featured Charlie Hebdo cartoons, and the tabloid BT used a Charlie Hebdo image depicting Muhammad lamenting being loved by "idiots" on its cover.

The newspaper was attacked by an arsonist on 11 January, possibly relating to the cartoons.
