= Dorothee Wilms =

German politician

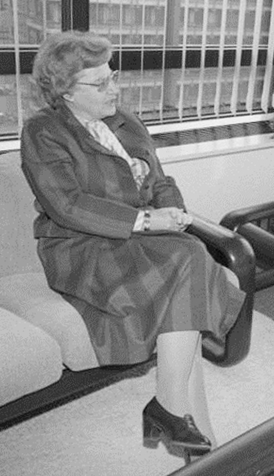
Dorothee Wilms, 1986

Dorothee Wilms (October 11, 1929 in Grevenbroich) is a German politician.

From 1982 to 1987 she was the Federal Minister for Education and Science and from 1987 to 1991 the Federal Minister for Inner-German relations.

== Education and career ==
After finishing school in 1950, Wilms began studying economics, social policy and sociology in Cologne, graduating in 1954. In 1956, she received a PhD completing a study on the macro and micro-economic processes in the German economy. From 1953 to 1973 she worked as a research assistant for youth and vocational training at the Institute of German Economy in Cologne. From 1977 to 1982 she was the head of the Center for Research in educational and socio-political development.

== Politics ==
In 1961 Dorothee Wilms joined the Christian Democratic Union (Germany) (CDU). From 1974 to 1976 she was deputy chairwoman of the CDU. In 1986 she was elected to the CDU Regional Executive, North Rhine-Westphalia. She was a member of the Board of the Konrad Adenauer Foundation for 25 years until 2005.

=== Bundestag ===
From 1976 to 1994 Wilms was a member of the German Bundestag. There she was parliamentary business manager of the CDU/CSU parliamentary group from 1980 to 1982.

=== Public office ===
Wilms was appointed on 4 October 1982 as the Federal Minister for Education and Science in the Cabinet of Chancellor Helmut Kohl. After the 1987 Bundestag elections, she was the Federal Minister for Intra-German relations. After German reunification, this ministry was dissolved. Since 1992 she was the chairperson of the Board of Trustees of the Public Service Foundation Chancellor Adenauer-Haus in Bad Honnef. She worked from 2000 to 2004 as chairperson of the Association of Former Members of the Bundestag and the European Parliament.
