= Diakonie Deutschland =

Logo

The Diakonie Deutschland is a charitable organization of Protestant churches in Germany (Protestant Church in Germany), Austria as well as numerous free churches. Its Roman Catholic equivalent is the Caritas.

== See also ==
- Diaconia
