= Wolfgang Vogel =

German lawyer (1925–2008)

- Born: 30 October 1925; Wilhelmsthal, Lower Silesia
- Died: 21 August 2008 (aged 82); Schliersee, Bavaria
- Occupation: Lawyer

Wolfgang Vogel (30 October 1925 – 21 August 2008) was a German lawyer active in East Germany at the time of the Cold War who had brokered some of the most famous swaps of spies or exchanges against ransom of political prisoners between the Soviet bloc and the West. A bridge between two worlds during three decades, he came to symbolize the ambiguity of his time and environment, and his career was cited as material worthy of espionage thriller novelists Len Deighton and John le Carré.

== Personal life ==
Vogel was born on 30 October 1925, in Wilhelmsthal (now Bolesławów, Poland), a small mountain village roughly 75 miles (130 km) to the south of Breslau in Lower Silesia: he studied law in Jena and Leipzig after World War II and graduated as a lawyer. In April 1946, he married his first wife Eva, with whom he had two children. The couple were divorced in 1966. In 1974, Vogel married his second wife, Helga Fritsch. Originating from Essen after meeting Vogel in 1968 she moved to East Germany in 1969. She worked as a secretary in Vogel's office, in Berlin-Friedrichsfelde. Following German reunification until Vogel's death, the couple lived in Schliersee in the Bavarian Alps.

== Career ==
He was employed by the Stasi to make contacts among West German lawyers, which would gradually make him a broker for the spy swaps and prisoner exchanges which would make him famous in East Germany. His first swap negotiation was the trading of Francis Gary Powers and Frederic Pryor for Vilyam Genrikhovich Fisher (Rudolf Abel). He also negotiated the exchange of Günter Guillaume in 1981, for captured Western agents. Overall, Vogel brokered the exchange of more than 150 spies and the exchange of Anatoly Shcharansky for Karl Koecher and his wife in 1986. He helped to broker the transfer of more than 34,000 East German political prisoners and 215,000 ordinary citizens to the West, beginning in 1964. Many of the prisoners were ransomed by the West German government or traded for prisoners in the West. Vogel received a secret fee from West Germany for facilitating these transactions.

== German reunification ==
After reunification, his Stasi links left him open to accusations of extortion, profiteering and tax evasion that culminated in his arrest; prisoners who returned to East Germany were forced to "sell" their homes and property at rock-bottom prices, and Vogel was suspected of benefitting from these extralegal confiscations. West German government officials also charged him with failing to pay income tax on the fees paid to him decades earlier for his services. Vogel was later convicted in a state court in Berlin in 1996 on five counts of blackmail, which led to a brief imprisonment. He appealed; Germany's highest court found in his favor in 1998 on two of the cases, and prosecutors agreed to drop the others.

Vogel died in his home in Schliersee, Bavaria, after suffering a heart attack.

== Legacy ==
In its report on his death, the German broadcaster Deutsche Welle stated that "during the height of the Cold War in the late 50s, Vogel was the only point man" between West and East Germany because the two states denied having any official contacts at the time.

In the 2015 film Bridge of Spies by Steven Spielberg, Vogel has a significant role in the plot. He is played by actor Sebastian Koch.

== Resources ==
- Craig R. Whitney (1993). Spy Trader: Germany's Devil's Advocate and the Darkest Secrets of the Cold War. Diane Publication Company. ISBN 978-0-7881-6946-5.
