= Wiesner family =

German Colombian family

Wiesner Family Wiessner
- Parent family: Abrahamssøn Wiesner; Christiansen Wiesner
- Country: Germany; Colombia; Ecuador
- Current region: Americas & Europe
- Origin: Freiberg, Saxony Germany
- Founded: 1800
- Founder: Jacob Benjamin Wiesner Heckerin
- Connected families: Anzola family Corradine family Rozo family De Francisco family Heckerin family Vergara family Robayo Family

The Wiesner Family is a Colombian family of German heritage. They emigrated to Colombia in the eighteenth century. The founder of the family was a German mineralogist and engineer, Named Jacob Benjamin Wiesner Heckerin born in Freiberg, Saxony, Germany who served as Director of Mines designated by Simon Bolivar. Family members served the country, as Minister of Finance, a Physician, lawyers, engineers, and businessman.

== History ==
In 1787, King Charles III of Spain asked the Elector of Saxony for skilled mineralogists to teach their profession and work in the mines of the New Kingdom of Granada, later Colombia. Eight young men were sent, including the founder of this family. Jacob Benjamin Wiesner Heckerin (1763–1842) was a German physicist, chemist, mathematic, mineralogist and Engineer born in Freiberg, Saxony, Germany. He graduated from University Technische Universität Bergakademie Freiberg. Wiesner served as Director of Mines for Bolivar in Zipaquirá, Colombia. Later, his descendants established themselves in Zipaquirá.

== Notables ==
- Jacob Benjamin Wiesner Heckerin (1763–1842) was a German physicist, chemist, mathematic, mineralogist and Engineer born in Freiberg, Saxony, Germany
- Grandchild of Jacob Jacobo Wiesner Morales was a journalist and businessman. He invented a vegetable soap that was manufactured for many years in Colombia.
- His great-grandchild Uldarico Wiesner Prado went to Quito and Quevedo. He settled in Guayaquil, where he constructed a large house, with a beer distributor and coal store on the lower floors. He created three families.
- Enrique Corradine Wiesner was the owner of Steelsworks Corradine (1942–1990).
- Eduardo Wiesner Durán served as Colombian Minister of Finance 1978–1982. He was President of the Bankers’ Association of Colombia 1976, National Professional Economics Council of Colombia 1977. He served as Head of National Planning Department. He was Director of Western Hemisphere Department, International Monetary Fund 1982–1987 and Special Trade Representative of International Monetary Fund since 1987. He worked as Director International Monetary Fund Office, Geneva since 1987 and became Executive Director World Bank May in 1989.
- Francisco Wiesner Rozo was a Colombian engineer. He led aqueduct exploration in Chingaza. Francisco Wiesner Treatment plant was named after him.
- Guillermo Wiesner Rozo was a builder and member of Bogota Market La Lonja. He was President of the Board of the Gimnasio Moderno School of Bogotá.
- Carolina Wiesner Ceballos Colombian physician, General Director of the National Cancer Institute of Colombia
- Guillermo Rojas Wiesner was an engineer. He worked for the municipality of Zipaquirá and Zipaquireña Identity.
- Gustavo Eduardo Vergara Wiesner was a lawyer. He worked as Director of the Colombian Family Welfare Institute, Vice President of Caracol, and First Notary to perform a virtual wedding in Colombia and digital & electronic document of South America.
- Raul Gerardo Wiesner Barros is a Colombian theatre director and acting coach for theater, film and television. Throughout his professional career he has trained numerous actors and actresses. He was married to Aida Morales until 2014. from that marriage they have a daughter.
- Efrain Robayo Wiesner had the first 1000cc motorcycle in Colombia

== Toponymy ==
- Wiesner
- Wiessner
- Wiesner Building Research laboratories in Cambridge, Massachusetts, USA. houses the MIT Media Lab, the Center for Bits and Atoms and the List Visual Arts Center
- Water treatment Plant Francisco Wiesner
