= Harold Weitzner =

American mathematician and physicist

Harold Weitzner is an American applied mathematician and physicist whose primary research is plasma physics. He is Professor Emeritus of Mathematics at the Courant Institute of Mathematical Sciences and has served as Director of the Magneto-Fluid Dynamics Division at Courant since 1981, succeeding Harold Grad. He has published over 120 research articles on the topics of plasma physics, magnetohydrodynamics, fluid mechanics, fractional equations and kinetics, and chaos.

Professor Weitzner received his Ph.D. in 1958 from Harvard University on the topic of "Hyperon-Nucleon Interactions".

In 1981 he was elected a Fellow of the American Physical Society.

== Selected publications ==
- Weitzner, Harold. "Green's function for the linearized Vlasov equation." The Physics of Fluids 5.8 (1962): 933–946.
- Cumberbatch, E., L. Sarason, and H. Weitzner. "Magnetohydrodynamic flow past a thin airfoil." AIAA Journal 1.3 (1963): 679–690.
- Weitzner, Harold. "Plasma oscillations and Landau damping." The Physics of Fluids 6.8 (1963): 1123–1127.
- Weitzner, Harold. "Green's Function for the Linearized One‐Dimensional Krook Equation with Electric Forces." The Physics of Fluids 6.4 (1963): 484–490.
- Weitzner, Harold. "Long-Wavelength Plasma Oscillations." Physics of Fluids 7 (1964): 476–477.
- Weitzner, Harold. "Radiation from a Point Source in a Plasma." The Physics of Fluids 7.1 (1964): 72–89.
- Weitzner, Harold. "Exponential damping of collisionless plasma oscillations." Communications on Pure and Applied Mathematics 18.1‐2 (1965): 307–311.
- Weitzner, Harold. "Extension of the Penrose Condition." The Physics of Fluids 9.3 (1966): 624–626.
- Weitzner, Harold, "Longitudinal Plasma Oscillations" in Magneto-fluid and plasma dynamics, Proceedings of a Symposium in Applied Mathematics, & American Mathematical Society (AMS, 1967)
- Weitzner, H., and D. Dobrott. "Ion waves in a collisionless plasma." The Physics of Fluids 11.1 (1968): 152–157.
- Blank, A. A., H. Grad, and H. Weitzner. "Toroidal High-β Equilibria." Plasma Physics and Controlled Nuclear Fusion Research. Proceedings of the Third International Conference on Plasma Physics and Controlled Nuclear Fusion Research. Vol. II. 1969.
- Grad, Harold, and Harold Weitzner. "Critical β from Stellarator and Scyllac Expansions." The Physics of Fluids 12.8 (1969): 1725–1727.

- Marder, B., and H. Weitzner. "A bifurcation problem in E-layer equilibria." Plasma Physics 12.6 (1970): 435.
- Weitzner, Harold. "Free boundary long helical wavelength equilibria." The Physics of Fluids 14.3 (1971): 658–670.
- Weitzner, Harold. "Growth rates and spectra for a particular axially symmetric equilibrium." The Physics of Fluids 16.2 (1973): 237–246.
- Freidberg, J. P., B. M. Marder, and H. Weitzner. "Stability of diffuse high-beta helical systems." Nuclear Fusion 14.6 (1974): 809.
- Freidberg, and H. Weitzner. "Endloss from a linear θ-pinch." Nuclear Fusion 15.2 (1975): 217.
- Weitzner, Harold. "Comparison of unstable modes and growth rates in ideal magnetohydrodynamics and guiding center plasmas." The Physics of Fluids 19.3 (1976): 420–426.
- Weitzner, Harold. "Steady plasma flow with a shock in a mirror." The Physics of Fluids 20.8 (1977): 1289–1295.
- Weitzner, Harold. "End loss from a theta pinch." The Physics of Fluids 20.3 (1977): 384–389.
- Weitzner, Harold, and Donald B. Batchelor. "Conversion between cold plasma modes in an inhomogeneous plasma." The Physics of Fluids 22.7 (1979): 1355–1358.

- Weitzner, Harold, and D. B. Batchelor. "An eikonal expansion of the Vlasov–Maxwell equations valid near cyclotron resonance." The Physics of Fluids 23.7 (1980): 1359–1367.
- Weitzner, Harold. "Motion of a charged particle in a nearly axisymmetric magnetic field." The Physics of Fluids 24.12 (1981): 2280–2294.
- Berk, Herbert L., James H. Hammer, and Harold Weitzner. "Analytic field-reversed equilibria." Physics of Fluids 24 (1981): 1758–1759.
- Weitzner, Harold. "Linear wave propagation in ideal magnetohydrodynamics." Basic plasma physics. 1. 1983.
- Weitzner, Harold. "Motion of a charged particle in slowly varying electromagnetic fields." Communications on pure and applied mathematics 36 (1983).
- Batchelor, D. B., R. C. Goldfinger, and Harold Weitzner. "Propagation and absorption of electromagnetic waves in fully relativistic plasmas." The Physics of fluids 27.12 (1984): 2835–2846.
- Grossmann, William, and Harold Weitzner. "A reformulation of lower‐hybrid wave propagation and absorption." The Physics of fluids 27.7 (1984): 1699–1703.
- Hirshman, S. P., and H. Weitzner. "A convergent spectral representation for three‐dimensional inverse magnetohydrodynamic equilibria." The Physics of fluids 28.4 (1985): 1207–1209.
- Weitzner, Harold. "Lower hybrid waves in the cold plasma model." Communications on pure and applied mathematics 38.6 (1985): 919–932.
- Amendt, Peter, and Harold Weitzner. "Relativistically covariant warm charged fluid beam modeling." The Physics of fluids 28.3 (1985): 949–957.
- Weitzner, Harold, and Wolfgang Kerner. "Tokamak transport based on the Braginskii model." Zeitschrift für Naturforschung A 42.10 (1987): 1101–1114.
- Jaeger, E. F., D. B. Batchelor, and H. Weitzner. "Exact and approximate solutions to the finite temperature wave equation in a one-dimensional perpendicularly stratified plasma." Nuclear fusion 28.1 (1988): 53.
- Weitzner, Harold, and William S. Lawson. "Boundary conditions for the Darwin model." Physics of Fluids B: Plasma Physics 1.10 (1989): 1953–1957.
- Weitzner, Harold. "Relativistic Plasmas" in Relativistic Fluid Dynamics (Springer, 1989) pp 211–237.

- Jaeger, E. F., et al. "Global ICRF wave propagation in edge plasma and Faraday shield regions." Nuclear fusion 30.3 (1990): 505.
- Weitzner, H., and D. Pfirsch. "Proof of a conjecture of Morrison and Pfirsch concerning negative-energy modes in Vlasov-Maxwell systems." Physical Review A 43.8 (1991): 4532.
- Morawetz, C. S., D. C. Stevens, and H. Weitzner. "A numerical experiment on a second‐order partial differential equation of mixed type." Communications on pure and applied mathematics 44.8‐9 (1991): 1091–1106.
- Boozer, A., Braams, B., Weitzner, H., Cohen, R., Hazeltine, R., Hinton, F., ... & Sigmar, D A survey of problems in divertor and edge plasma theory. No. DOE/ER/53223-196; MF-125. New York Univ., NY (United States). Magneto-Fluid Dynamics Div.; USDOE Divertor and Edge Plasma Theory Working Group, Washington, DC (United States), 1992.
- Stevens, D. C., H. Weitzner, and D. Pfirsch. "Moment series expansions for a model kinetic equation." Physics of Fluids B: Plasma Physics 4.9 (1992): 2769–2784.
- Boozer, A., Braams, B., Weitzner, H., Cohen, R., Hazeltine, R., Hinton, F., ... & Sigmar, D. A survey of problems in divertor and edge plasma theory. No. DOE/ER/53223-196; MF-125. New York Univ., NY (United States). Magneto-Fluid Dynamics Div.; USDOE Divertor and Edge Plasma Theory Working Group, Washington, DC (United States), 1992.
- Zaslavsky, G. M., D. Stevens, and H. Weitzner. "Self-similar transport in incomplete chaos." Physical Review E 48.3 (1993): 1683.
- Weitzner, Harold. "Conditions for the existence of steady state stellarators." Physics of Plasmas 5.2 (1998): 417–432.
- Weitzner, Harold, and Dieter Pfirsch. "Nonperiodicity in space of the magnetic moment series." Physics of Plasmas 6.1 (1999): 420–423.

- Zaslavsky, G. M., Edelman, M., Weitzner, H., Carreras, B., McKee, G., Bravenec, R., & Fonck, R. "Large-scale behavior of the tokamak density fluctuations." Physics of Plasmas 7.9 (2000): 3691–3698.
- Weitzner, Harold, et al. "Ion flow driven by waves in the ion cyclotron frequency range." Physics of Plasmas 7.2 (2000): 564–570.
- Weitzner, Harold, and Zaslavsky, G. M. "Directional fractional kinetics." Chaos: An Interdisciplinary Journal of Nonlinear Science 11.2 (2001): 384–396.
- Chang, Choong-Seock, Seunghoe Kue, and H. Weitzner. "X-transport: A baseline nonambipolar transport in a diverted tokamak plasma edge." Physics of Plasmas 9.9 (2002): 3884–3892.
- Chang, Choong-Seock, Seunghoe Kue, and H. Weitzner. "X-transport: A baseline nonambipolar transport in a diverted tokamak plasma edge." Physics of Plasmas 9.9 (2002): 3884–3892.
- Jaeger, E. F., Berry, L. A., D’Azevedo, E., Batchelor, D. B., Carter, M. D., White, K. F., & Weitzner, H. (2002). Advances in full-wave modeling of radio frequency heated, multidimensional plasmas. Physics of Plasmas, 9(5), 1873–1881.
- Weitzner, H., and Zaslavsky, G. M. "Some applications of fractional equations." Communications in nonlinear science and numerical simulation 8.3-4 (2003): 273–281.
- Weitzner, Harold, and Choong-Seock Chang. "Single particle motion near an X point and separatrix." Physics of Plasmas 11.6 (2004): 3060–3067.
- Weitzner, Harold, and Choong-Seock Chang. "Extensions of adiabatic invariant theory for a charged particle." Physics of plasmas 12.1 (2005): 012106.
- Chang, Choong-Seock, Seunghoe Ku, and H. Weitzner. "Numerical study of neoclassical plasma pedestal in a tokamak geometry." Physics of Plasmas 11.5 (2004): 2649–2667.
- Weitzner, Harold, and Choong-Seock Chang. "Single particle motion near an X point and separatrix." Physics of Plasmas 11.6 (2004): 3060–3067.
- Throumoulopoulos, G. N., Harold Weitzner, and Henri Tasso. "On nonexistence of tokamak equilibria with purely poloidal flow." Physics of plasmas 13.12 (2006): 122501.
- Keyes, Jonathan, and Harold Weitzner. "An adiabatic invariant for single-particle motion in static axisymmetric magnetic fields with large wave-number variations." Physics of plasmas 13.8 (2006): 084501.

- Jagannath, Aukosh, and Harold Weitzner. "Charged particle motion in electromagnetic fields varying moderately rapidly in space." Physics of Plasmas 18.10 (2011): 104510.
- Weitzner, Harold. "Characterization of a class of stellarator steady states." Physics of Plasmas 18.1 (2011): 012501.
- Weitzner, Harold. "Ideal magnetohydrodynamic equilibrium in a non-symmetric topological torus." Physics of Plasmas 21.2 (2014): 022515.
- Sengupta, Wrick, and Harold Weitzner. "Radial confinement of deeply trapped particles in a non-symmetric magnetohydrodynamic equilibrium." Physics of Plasmas 25.2 (2018): 022506.
