= Goldbach (Münzbach) =

River in Germany

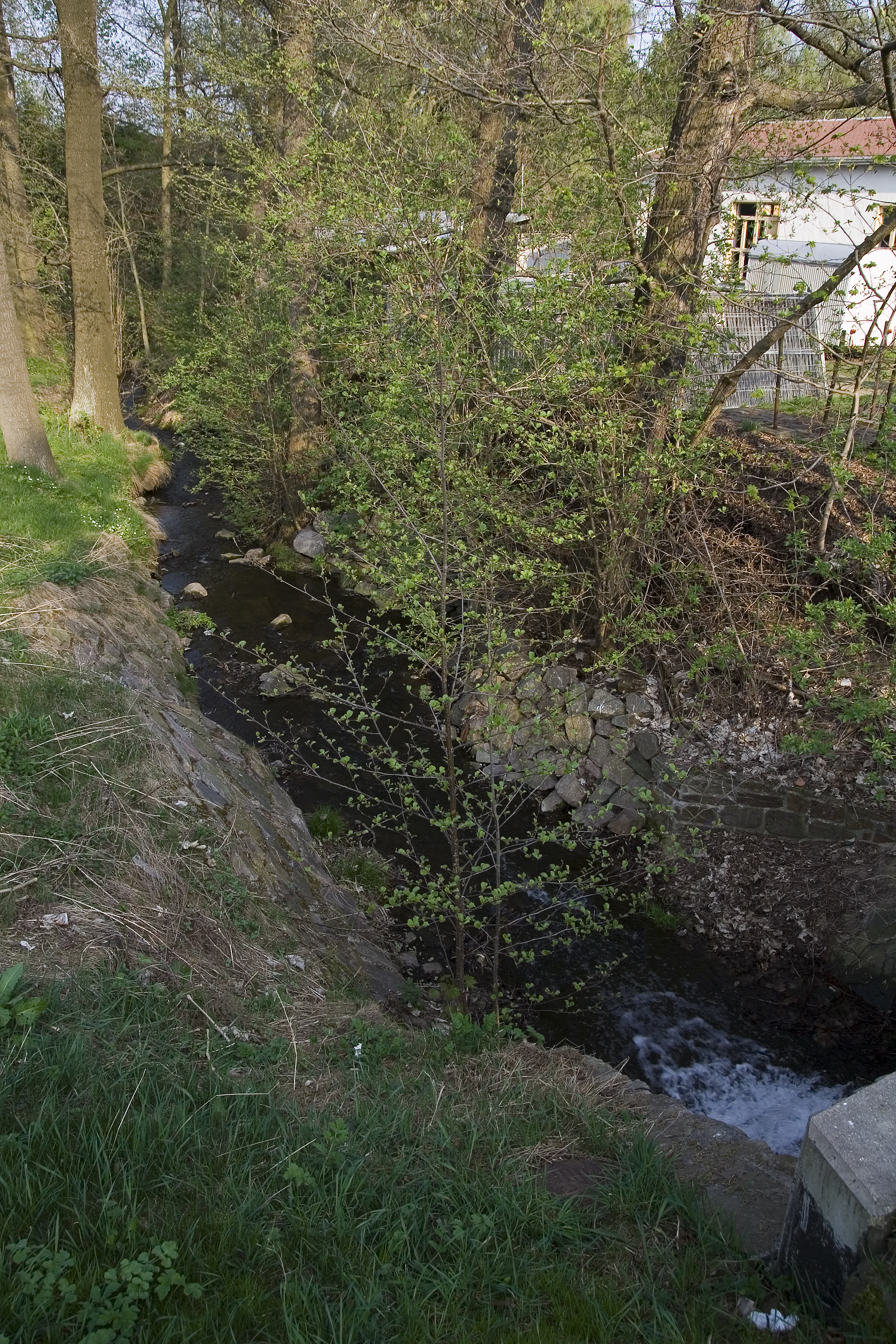

Location
- Country: Germany
- States: Saxony

Physical characteristics
- Mouth: Münzbach
  - coordinates: 50.9584°N 13.3302°E

Basin features
- Progression: Münzbach→ Freiberger Mulde→ Mulde→ Elbe→ North Sea

The Goldbach (German pronunciation: [ˈɡɔltbax]) is a river of Saxony, Germany. It is a left tributary of the Münzbach, which it joins in Freiberg.

== See also ==
- List of rivers of Saxony
