= Weitzner =

Weitzner is a surname. Notable people with the surname include:

- Daniel Weitzner, American research scientist
- Harold Weitzner, American mathematician
- Larry Weitzner, American political consultant
- Lori Weitzner, American textile and product designer

== See also ==
- Weissner, surname
- Wiessner, surname
