= Weissner =

Weissner is a surname. Notable people with the surname include:

- Carl Weissner (1940–2012), German writer and translator
- Hilde Weissner (1909–1987), German actress

== See also ==
- Weitzner, surname
- Wiessner, surname
