= Thomm =

- Municipality
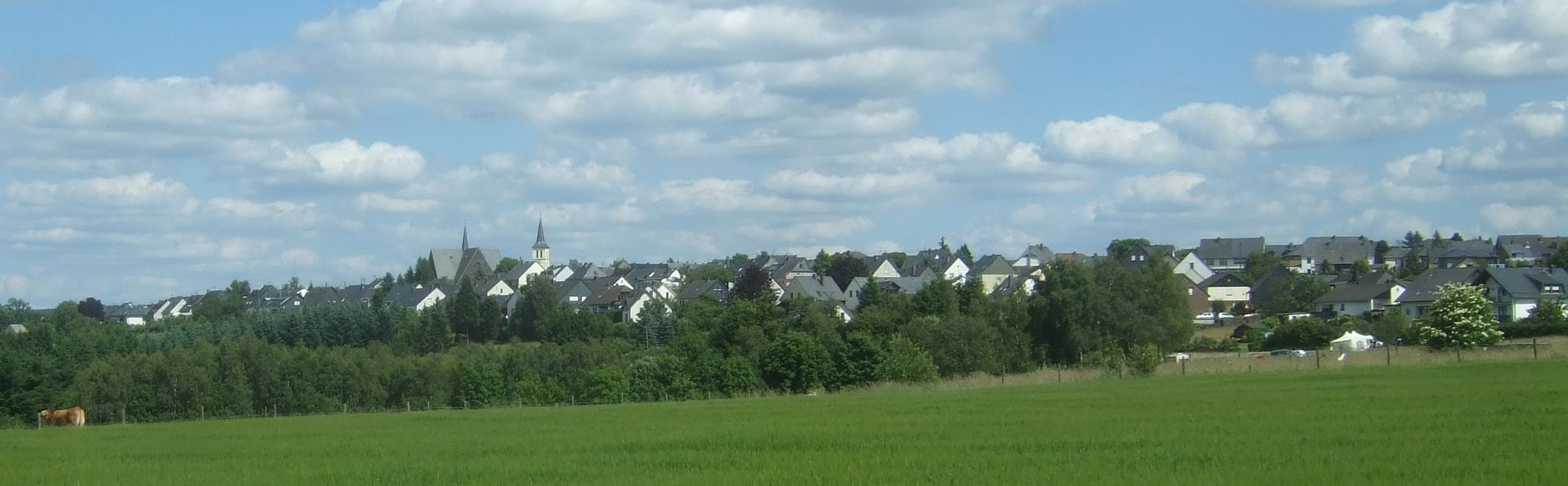

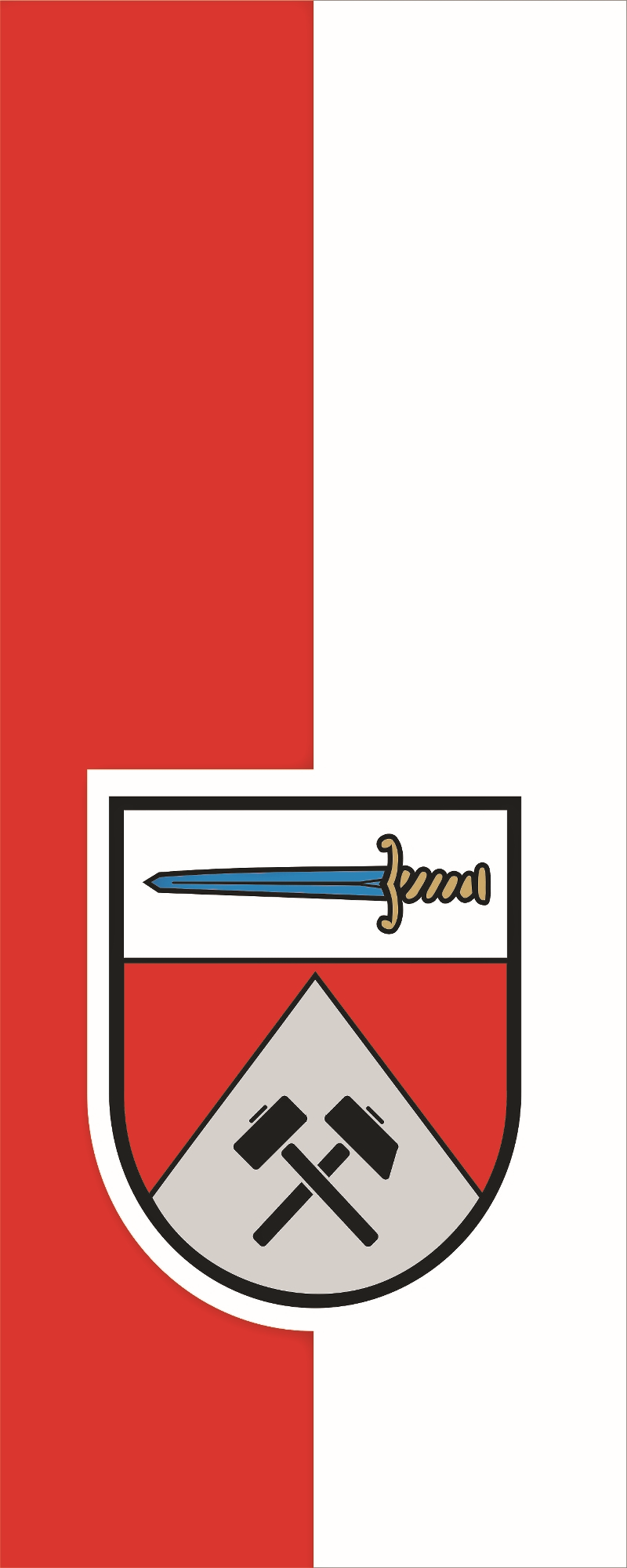
- Flag Coat of arms

- Location of Thomm within Trier-Saarburg district
- Interactive map of Thomm
- Location within Germany Location within Rhineland-Palatinate
- Coordinates: 49°44′10″N 6°48′00″E
- Country: Germany
- State: Rhineland-Palatinate
- District: Trier-Saarburg
- Municipal assoc.: Ruwer

Area
  - Total: 4.49 km^{2} (1.73 sq mi)
- Elevation: 462 m (1,516 ft)

Population (2025-12-31)
  - Total: 1,068
  - Density: 238/km^{2} (616/sq mi)
- Time zone: UTC+01:00 (CET)
  - Summer (DST): UTC+02:00 (CEST)
- Postal codes: 54317
- Dialling codes: 06500
- Vehicle registration: TR
- Website: www.thomm-online.de

Thomm (German pronunciation: [tɔm]) is a municipality in the Trier-Saarburg district, in Rhineland-Palatinate, Germany, near Trier on the river Moselle.

The Fell Exhibition Slate Mine is adjacent to Thomm.
