= Freiberg =

Town in Saxony, Germany

- Town
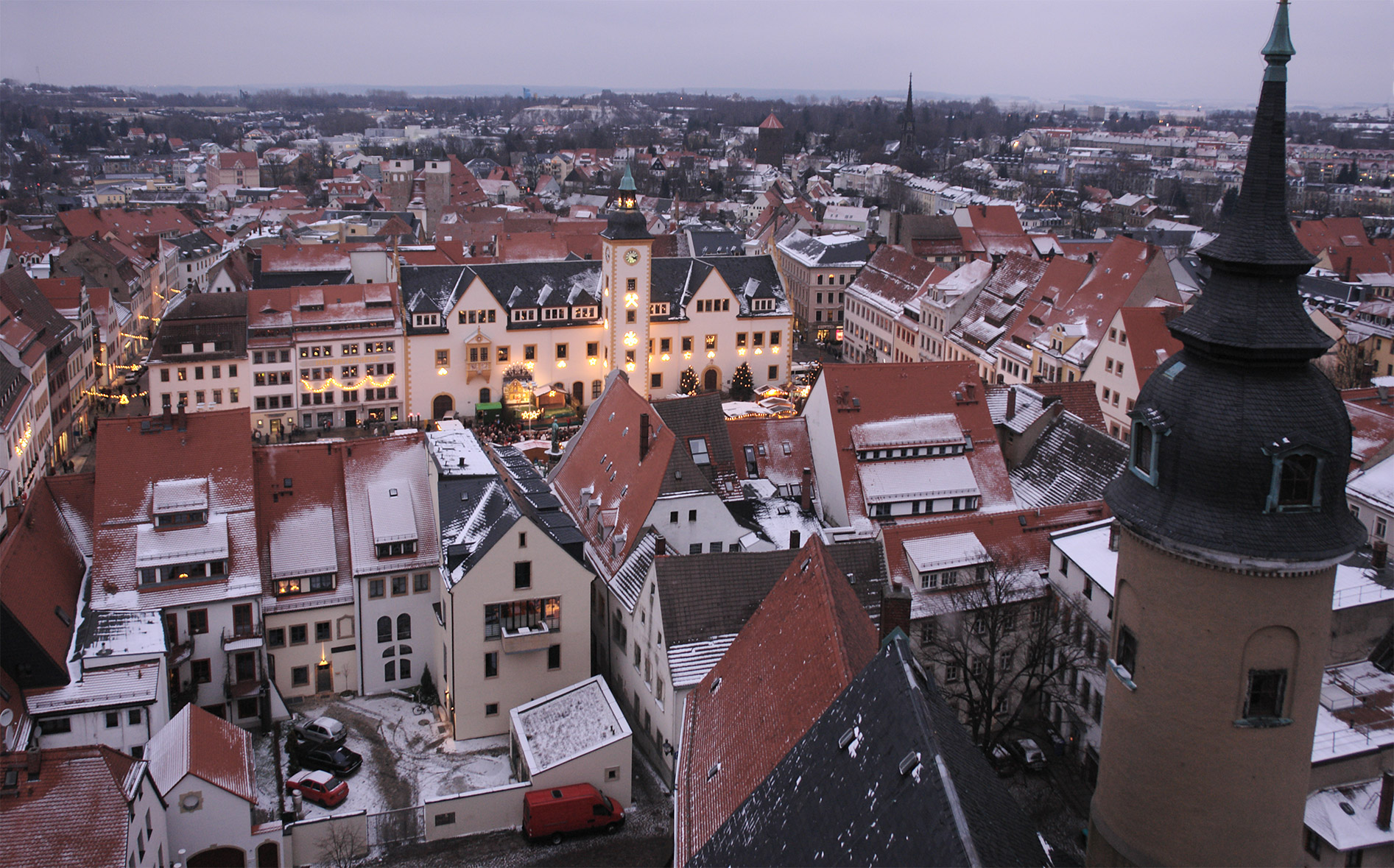
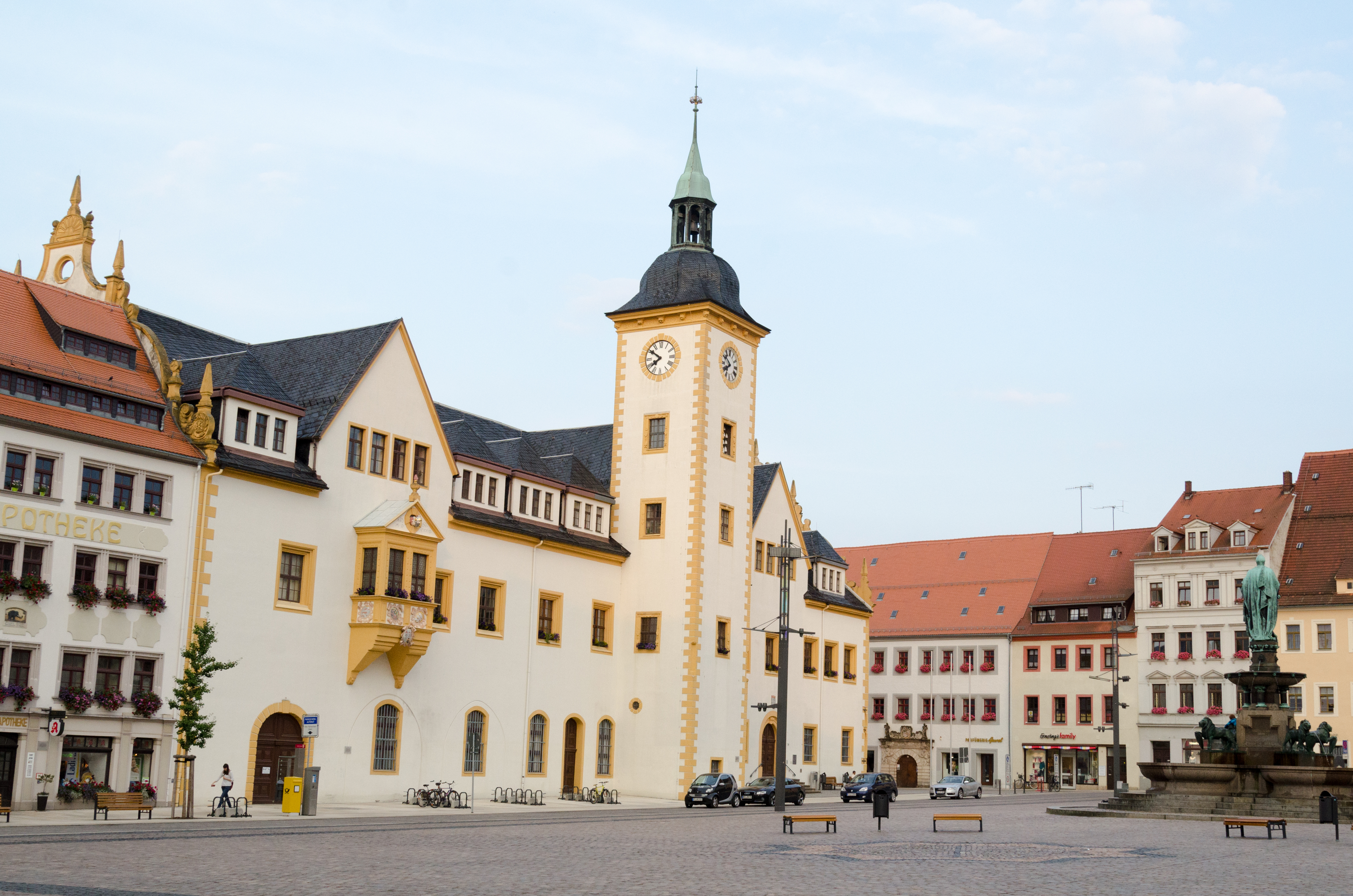
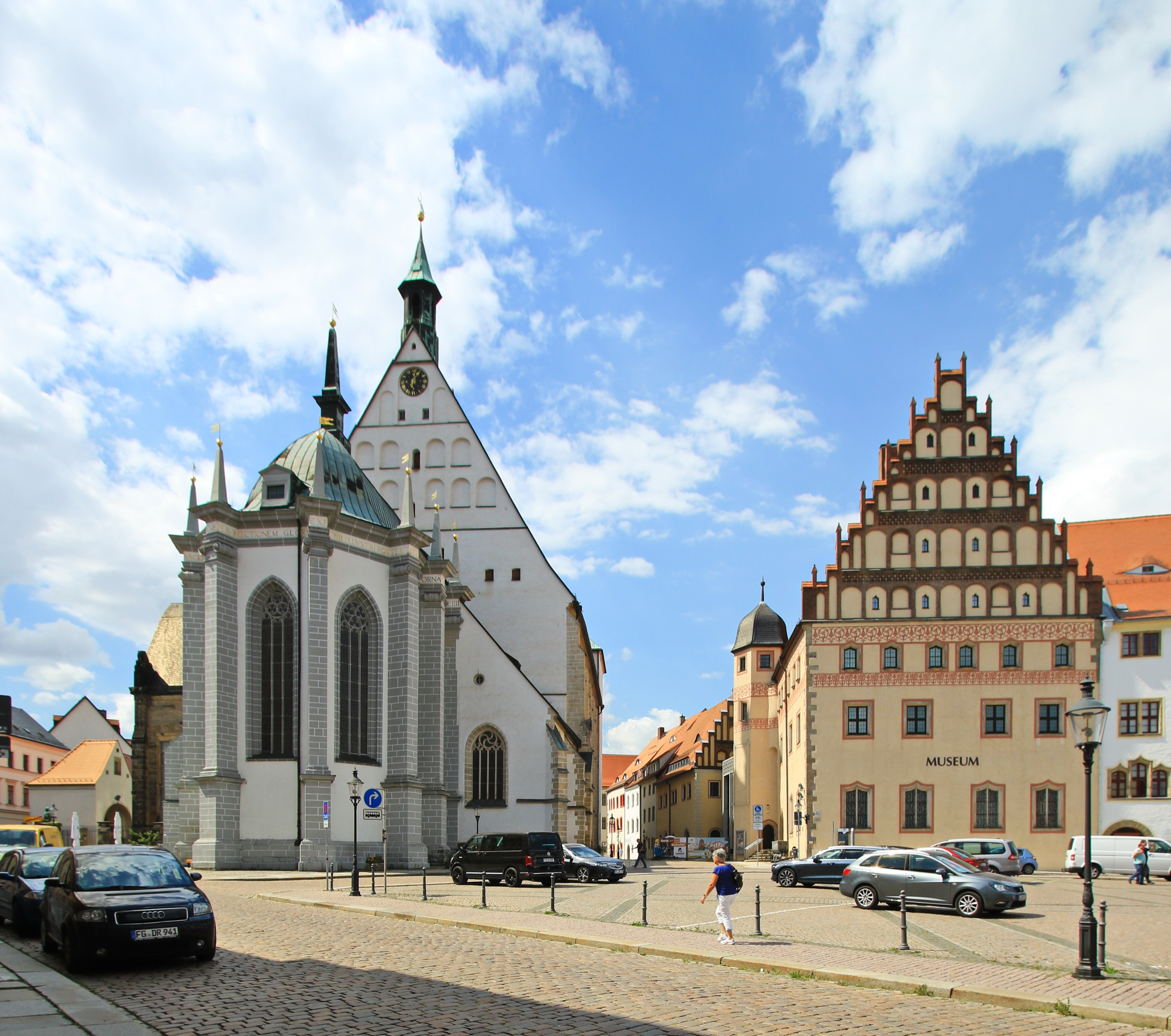
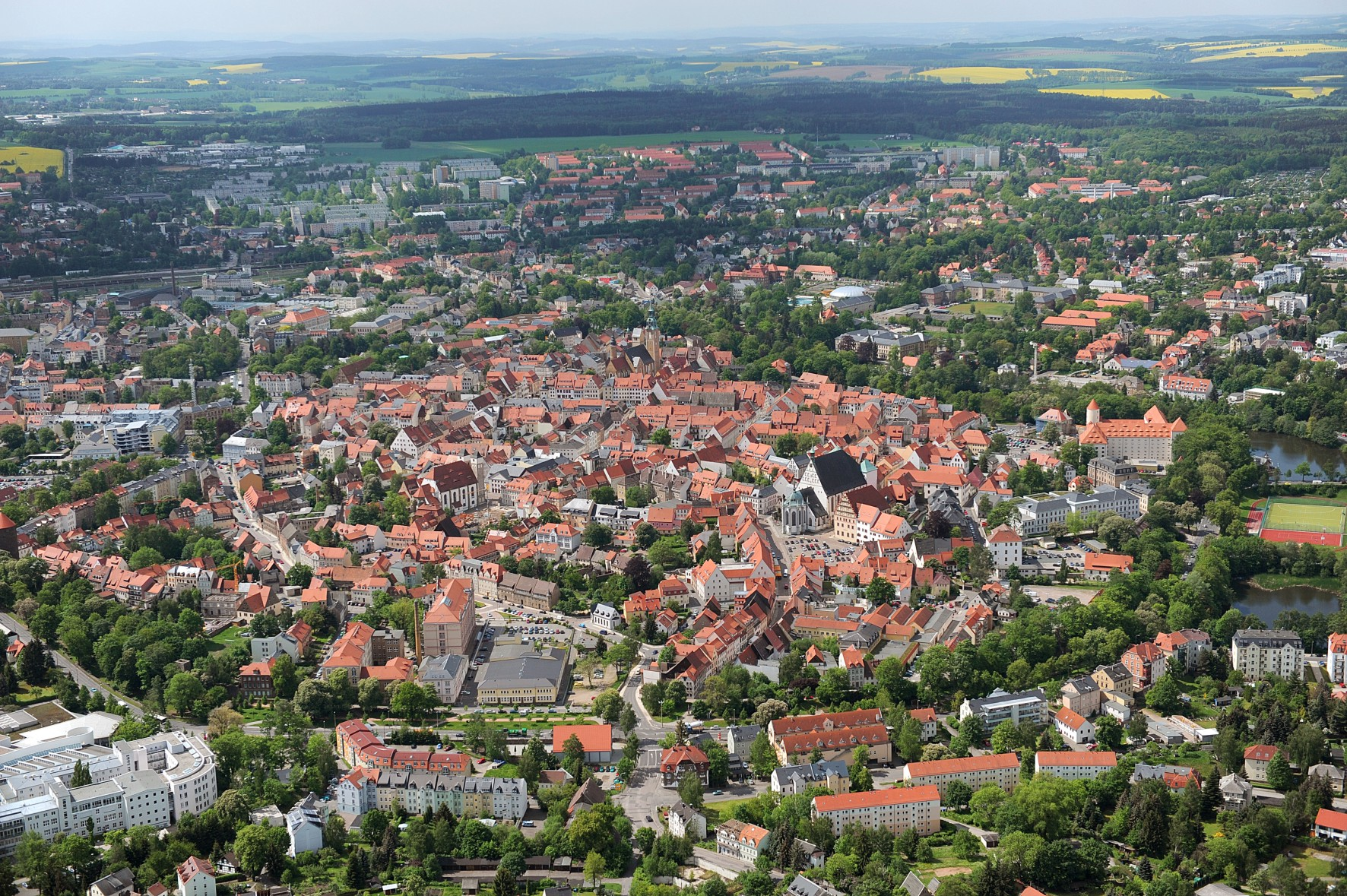
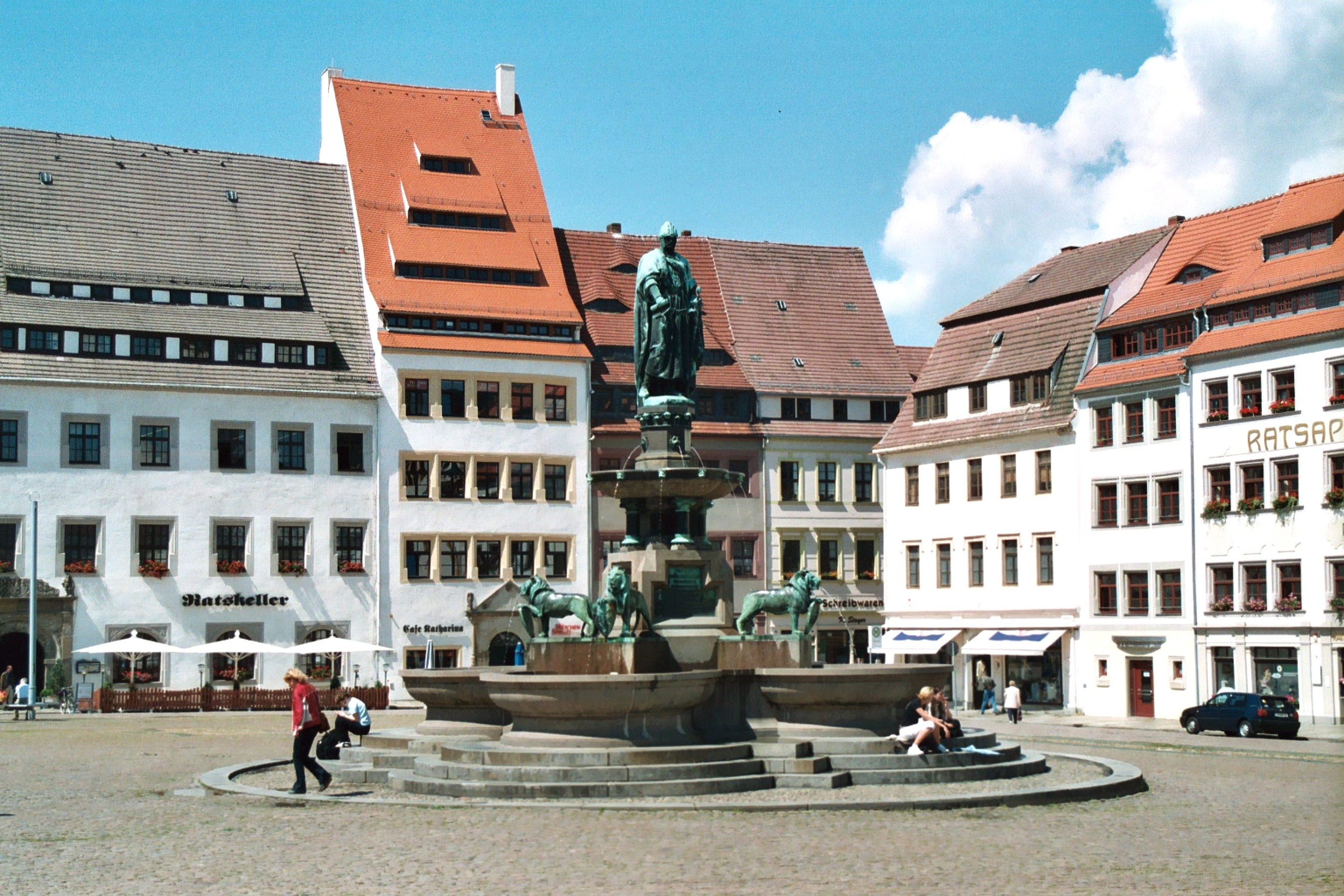
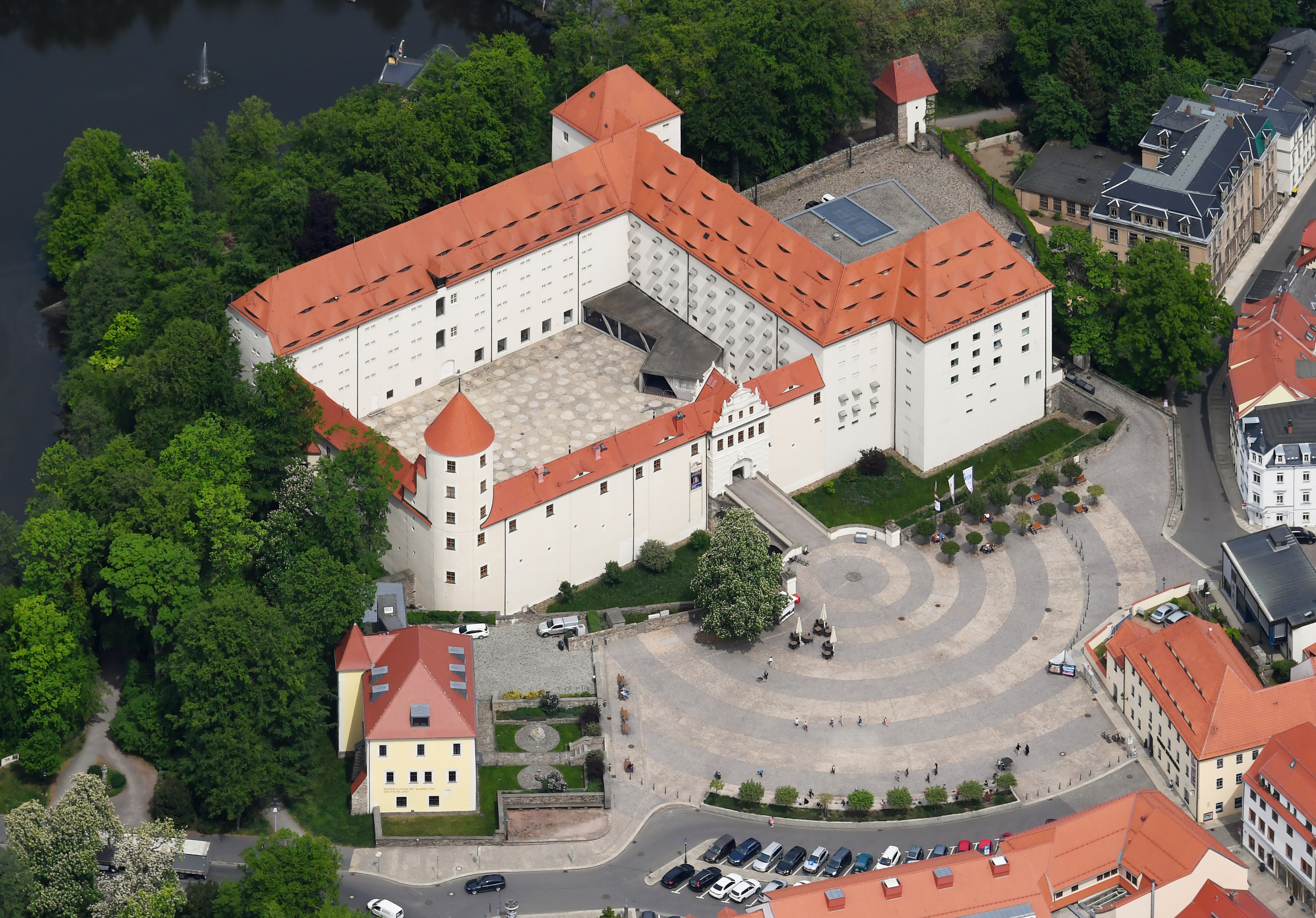
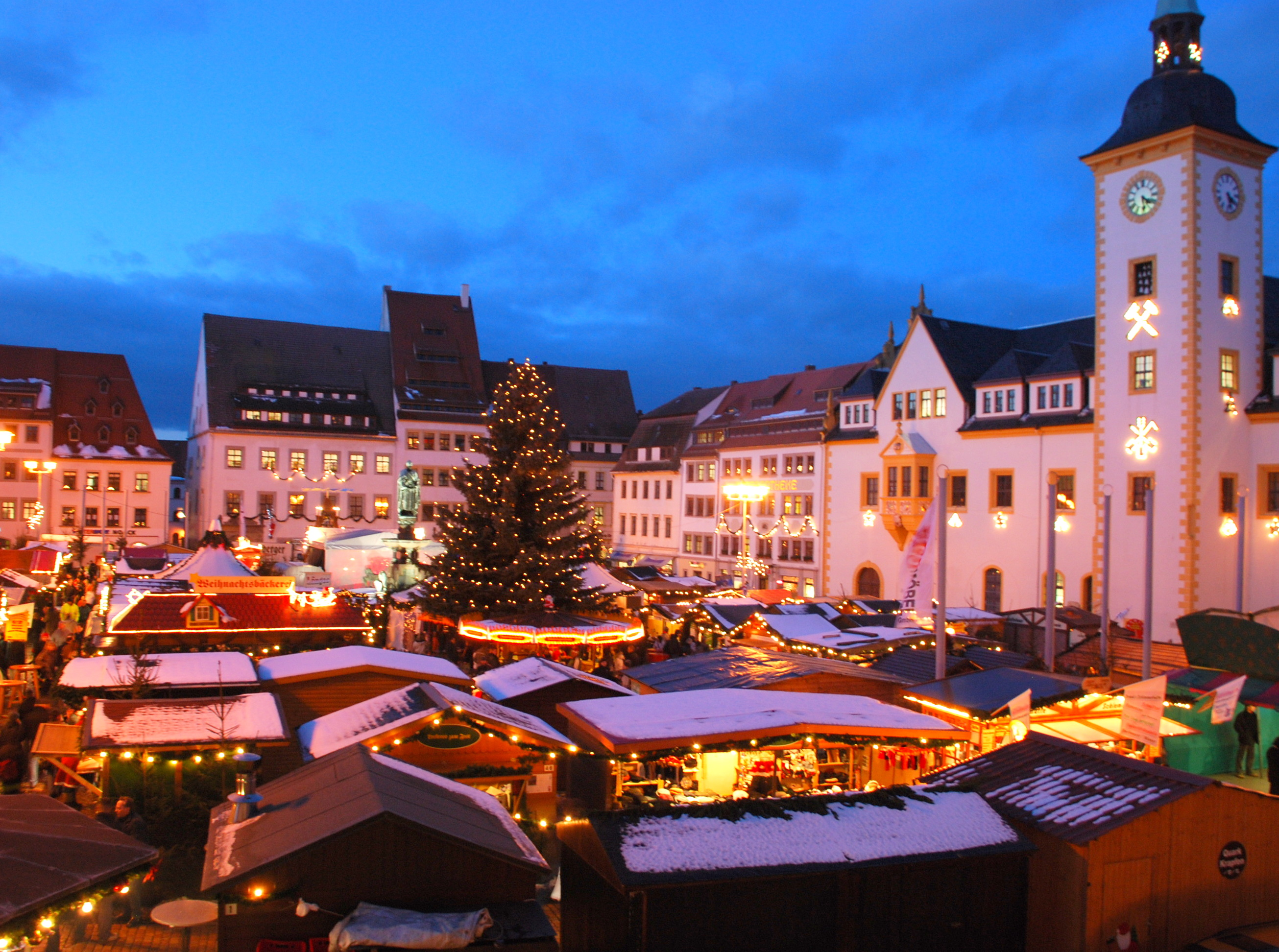
- Freiberg from St Peter's Church Town hall Freiberg Cathedral Old town from above Obermarkt Freudenstein Castle Freiberger Christmarkt

- Coat of arms

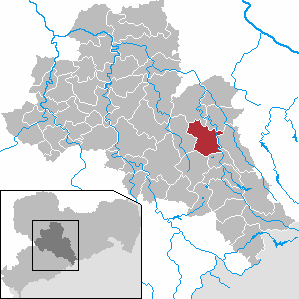
- Location of Freiberg within Mittelsachsen district
- Interactive map of Freiberg
- Location within Germany Location within Saxony
- Coordinates: 50°54′43″N 13°20′34″E
- Country: Germany
- State: Saxony
- District: Mittelsachsen
- Subdivisions: 8

Government
  - Mayor (2022–29): Sven Krüger

Area
  - Total: 48.05 km^{2} (18.55 sq mi)
- Elevation: 400 m (1,300 ft)

Population (2025-12-31)
  - Total: 41,205
  - Density: 857.5/km^{2} (2,221/sq mi)
- Time zone: UTC+01:00 (CET)
  - Summer (DST): UTC+02:00 (CEST)
- Postal codes: 09599, 09596
- Dialling codes: 03731
- Vehicle registration: FG
- Website: www.freiberg.de

Freiberg (German pronunciation: [ˈfʁaɪbɛʁk]) is a university and former mining town in Saxony, Germany, with around 41,000 inhabitants. The city lies in the foreland of the Ore Mountains, in the Saxon urbanization axis, which runs along the northern edge of the Elster and Ore Mountains, stretching from Plauen in the southwest via Zwickau, Chemnitz and Freiberg to Dresden in the northeast. It sits on the Freiberger Mulde, a tributary of the Mulde River. It is a Große Kreisstadt (large district town), and the administrative seat of Landkreis Mittelsachsen (district Central Saxony). Freiberg is connected to Dresden by the S3 line of the Dresden S-Bahn.

The entire historic center of the Silver City is under monument protection, and together with local monuments of mining history such as the Reiche Zeche ore mine, it has been part of the UNESCO World Heritage Site Erzgebirge/Krušnohoří Mining Region since 2019 due to its exceptional testimony to the development of mining techniques across many centuries.

Freiberg University of Mining and Technology (Technische Universität Bergakademie Freiberg), founded in 1765, is the oldest university of mining and metallurgy in the world. Until 1969, the town was dominated for around 800 years by the mining and smelting industries. Since then it has restructured into a high technology site in the fields of semiconductor manufacture and solar technology, part of Silicon Saxony.

Freiberg Cathedral is one of the most richly furnished houses of worship in Saxony and contains important works of art such as the tulip pulpit, two Gottfried Silbermann organs, the choir, which was converted into a burial place for the Albertine Wettins, and the Golden Gate (Goldene Pforte), of which exist three replicas, in Moscow, Budapest, and Cambridge, Massachusetts.

Freiberg's christmas market Freiberger Christmarkt is typical for christmas markets in the Ore Mountain region, which are characterized by a strong connection to mining and the typical christmas decorations of this region like Raachermannel, Schwibbögen and Christmas pyramids.

== Geography ==
=== Location ===
The town lies on the northern declivity of the Ore Mountains, with the majority of the borough west of the Eastern or Freiberger Mulde river. Parts of the town are nestled in the valleys of Münzbach and Goldbach streams. Its centre has an altitude of about 412 m above sea level (NHN) (at the railway station). Its lowest point is on Münzbach on the town boundary at 340 m above NHN; its highest point is on an old mining tip at 491 m above NHN. Freiberg lies within a region of old forest clearances, subsequently used by the mining industry which left its mark on the landscape. The town is surrounded to the north, southeast and southwest by woods, and in the other directions by fields and meadows. Since the beginning of the 21st century an urbanised area has gradually developed which is formed by the towns of Nossen, Roßwein, Großschirma, Freiberg and Brand-Erbisdorf. It currently has about 75,000 inhabitants.

Freiberg is located about 31 kilometres (19 miles) west-southwest of Dresden, about 31 kilometres east-northeast of Chemnitz, about 82 kilometres (51 miles) southeast of Leipzig, about 179 kilometres (111 miles) south of Berlin, and about 120 kilometres (75 miles) northwest of Prague.

Freiberg lies on a boundary between two variants of the Upper Saxon dialect: the Southeast Meissen dialect (Südostmeißnisch) to the east and the South Meissen dialect (Südmeißnisch) to the west of the town, both belonging to the five Meissen dialects, as well as just north of the border of the dialect region of East Erzgebirgisch.

=== Expansion of the town ===
The nucleus of the town, the former forest village of Christiansdorf lies in the valley of the Münzbach stream. The unwalled town centre grew up on its two slopes and on the ridge to the west. This means inter alia that the roads radiating outwards east of the old main road axis (today Erbische Straße and Burgstraße running from the former Erbisch Gate (Erbischer Tor) on Postplatz to Freudenstein Castle), some of which run as far as the opposite side of the Münzbach valley, are very steep. The area located east of the main road axis is called Unterstadt ("Lower Town"), with its lower market or Untermarkt. The western area is the Oberstadt ("Upper Town") where the Obermarkt or "Upper Market" is situated. The town centre is surrounded by a green belt running along the old town wall. In the west, this belt, in which the ponds of the Kreuzteichen are set, broadens out into an area like a park. Just north of the town centre is Freudenstein Castle as well as the remnants of the town wall with several wall towers and Schlüsselteich pond in front of them. The remains of the wall run eastwards, in sections, to the Donats Tower. This area is dominated by the historic moat. The southern boundary of the old town is characterised in places by buildings from the Gründerzeit period. The B 101 federal road, here called Wallstraße, flanks the west of the town centre, the B 173, as Schillerstraße and Hornstraße, bounds it to the south.

Freiberg's north is dominated by the campus of its University of Mining and Technology. The main part of the campus on either side of Leipziger Straße (as the B 101 road, the most important transport link in this district) emerged in the 1950s and 1960s. Furthermore, the districts of Lossnitz, Lößnitz and Kleinwaltersdorf are found here, extending almost out to the boundary of the borough. Between Kleinwaltersdorf and Lößnitz is the Nonnenwald wood, and east of Leipziger Straße is a trading estate.

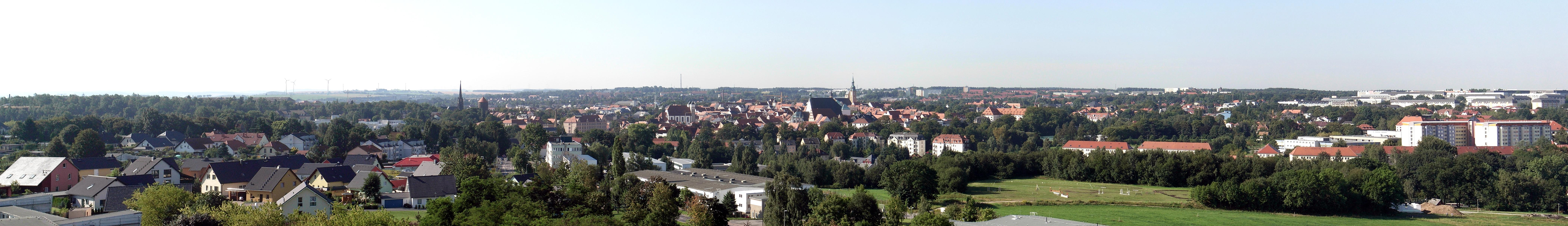
Panorama from Freiberg looking from southwest to north

=== Surrounding area ===
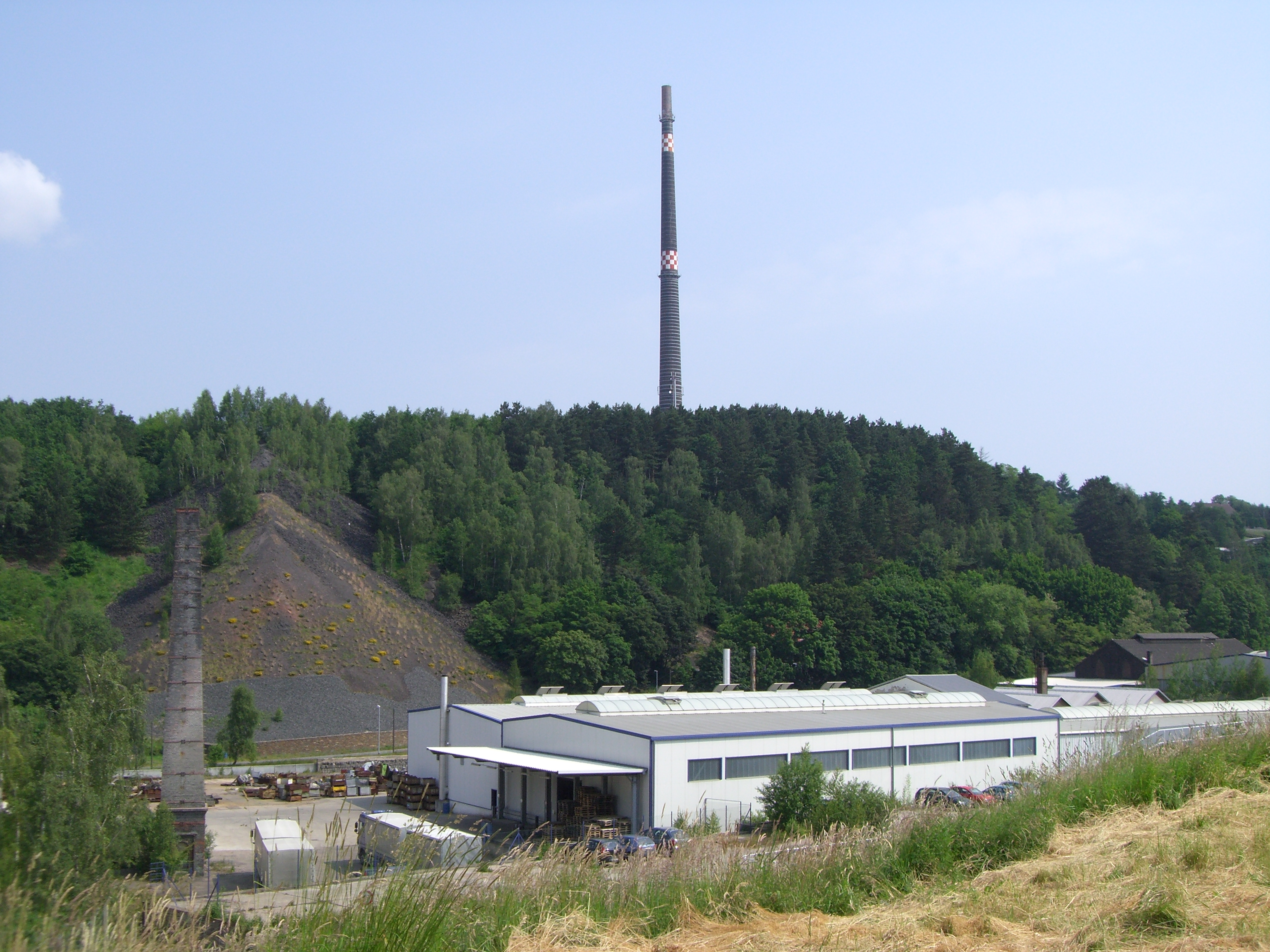
The slag heap of "Hohe Esse" with the Feinhütte Halsbrücke in the foreground

In the area around Freiberg there are both industrial estates as well as agricultural and recreational areas. Smelting and metalworking firms are based at Muldenhütten and Halsbrücke and paper manufacturers at Weißenborn and Großschirma. Northeast of the town is the recreational area of the Tharandt Forest.

The town of Großschirma lies north of Freiberg on the B 101 federal road. To the northeast the municipality of Halsbrücke borders on the territory of Freiberg's borough and, to the east, is the municipality of Bobritzsch-Hilbersdorf. The municipality of Weißenborn to the southeast belongs to the Verwaltungsgemeinschaft of Lichtenberg/Erzgebirge. On the B 101 south of Freiberg is the Große Kreisstadt of Brand-Erbisdorf and to the east is the municipality of Oberschöna.

=== Town subdivisions and residential areas ===
- Bahnhofsvorstadt
- Donatsviertel
- Fernesiechen
- Freibergsdorf
- Friedeburg
- Halsbach
- Himmelfahrter Revier
- Hinter dem Bahnhof
- Hospitalviertel
- Hüttenviertel
- Kleinwaltersdorf
- Langenrinne
- Lößnitz
- Loßnitz
- Neufriedeburg
- Oberstadt
- Scheunenviertel
- Seilerberg
- Silberhofviertel
- Steinberg
- Unterstadt
- Wasserberg
- Zug

== History ==
Map of Freiberg (around 1750)

Historical affiliations

Margraviate of Meissen 1186–1423
Electorate of Saxony 1423–1806
Kingdom of Saxony 1806–1871
German Empire 1871–1918
Weimar Republic 1918–1933
Nazi Germany 1933–1945
Allied-occupied Germany 1945–1949
German Democratic Republic 1949–1990
Germany 1990–present

The town was founded around 1168, after a silver discovery led to the first Berggeschrey, and has been a centre of the mining industry in the Ore Mountains for centuries. A symbol of that history is the Freiberg University of Mining and Technology, often just known as the Mining Academy (Bergakademie), established in 1765 and the oldest extant university of mining and metallurgy in the world. Freiberg also has a notable cathedral containing two famous Gottfried Silbermann organs. There are two other organs made by Gottfried Silbermann in the town – one at the St. Peter's Church (Petrikirche) and the other one at the St. James' Church (Jakobikirche).

The Renaissance part of Freiberg, built after a fire destroyed the town in 1484, stands under heritage protection.

In 1913, silver mining was discontinued due to the decline in the price of silver. Resumed before the Second World War, mining activities for lead, zinc and tin extraction continued until 1969.

In 1944, a subcamp of Flossenbürg concentration camp was built outside the town of Freiberg. It housed over 500 female survivors of other camps, including Auschwitz. Altogether 50 or so SS women worked in this camp until its evacuation in April 1945. The female survivors eventually reached Mauthausen concentration camp in Austria.

In 1985, The Church of Jesus Christ of Latter-day Saints built the Freiberg Germany Temple here because of the large number of members in the region. The building of this temple is considered quite historic by church members given the political climate in Eastern Europe at the time. The Freiberg Germany Temple serves members of The Church of Jesus Christ of Latter-day Saints from all over Eastern Germany and a majority of Eastern Europe.

On 6 July 2019, the Erzgebirge/Krušnohoří Mining Region including Freiberg was inscribed as a UNESCO World Heritage Site.

=== Regular events ===
Every year in Freiberg the Mining Town Festival (Bergstadtfest) is held on the last weekend in June with a procession by the historic Miners' and Ironworkers' Guilds, the so-called Miners' and Ironworkers' Parade. The Freiberg Christmas Market takes place during Advent, when a so-called Mettenschicht is held with a parade by the Miners' and Ironworkers' Guilds and the SAXONIA Miners Music Corps. This includes a traditional Sermon on the Mount in St. Peter's Church and waiting by the miners on the second Saturday in Advent. Firmly established is the potter's gathering on a weekend in the second half of April on the Upper Market (Obermarkt). Every year on the Drei Brüder Schacht mineshaft in the quarter of Zug there is a model steam engine gathering. Other annual events include the Freiberg Art Award and the election of the Mining Town Queen (Bergstadt-Königin).

== Education ==
The Technische Universität Bergakademie Freiberg (Freiberg University of Mining and Technology or Freiberg Mining Academy, University of Technology) was established in 1765 by Prince Franz Xaver, regent of Saxony, based on plans by Friedrich Wilhelm von Oppel and Friedrich Anton von Heynitz, and is the oldest extant university of mining and metallurgy in the world.

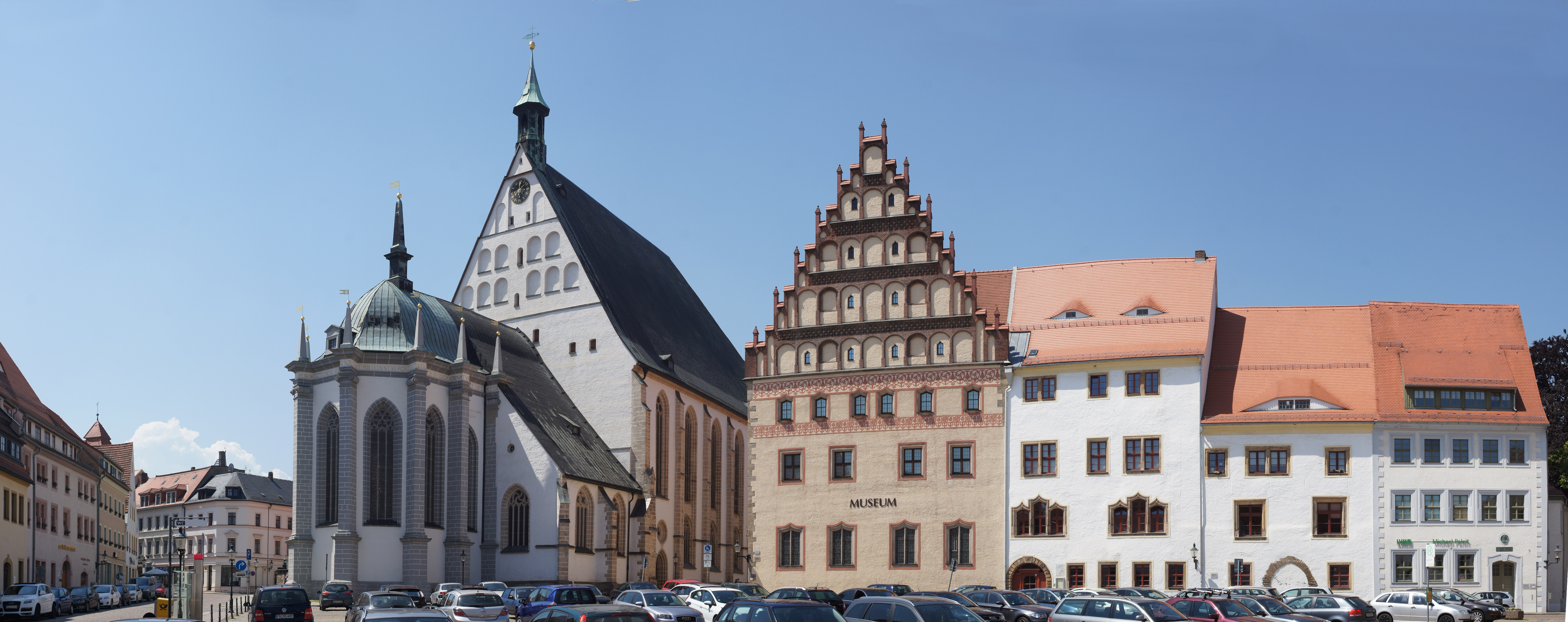
Untermarkt (Lower Market)

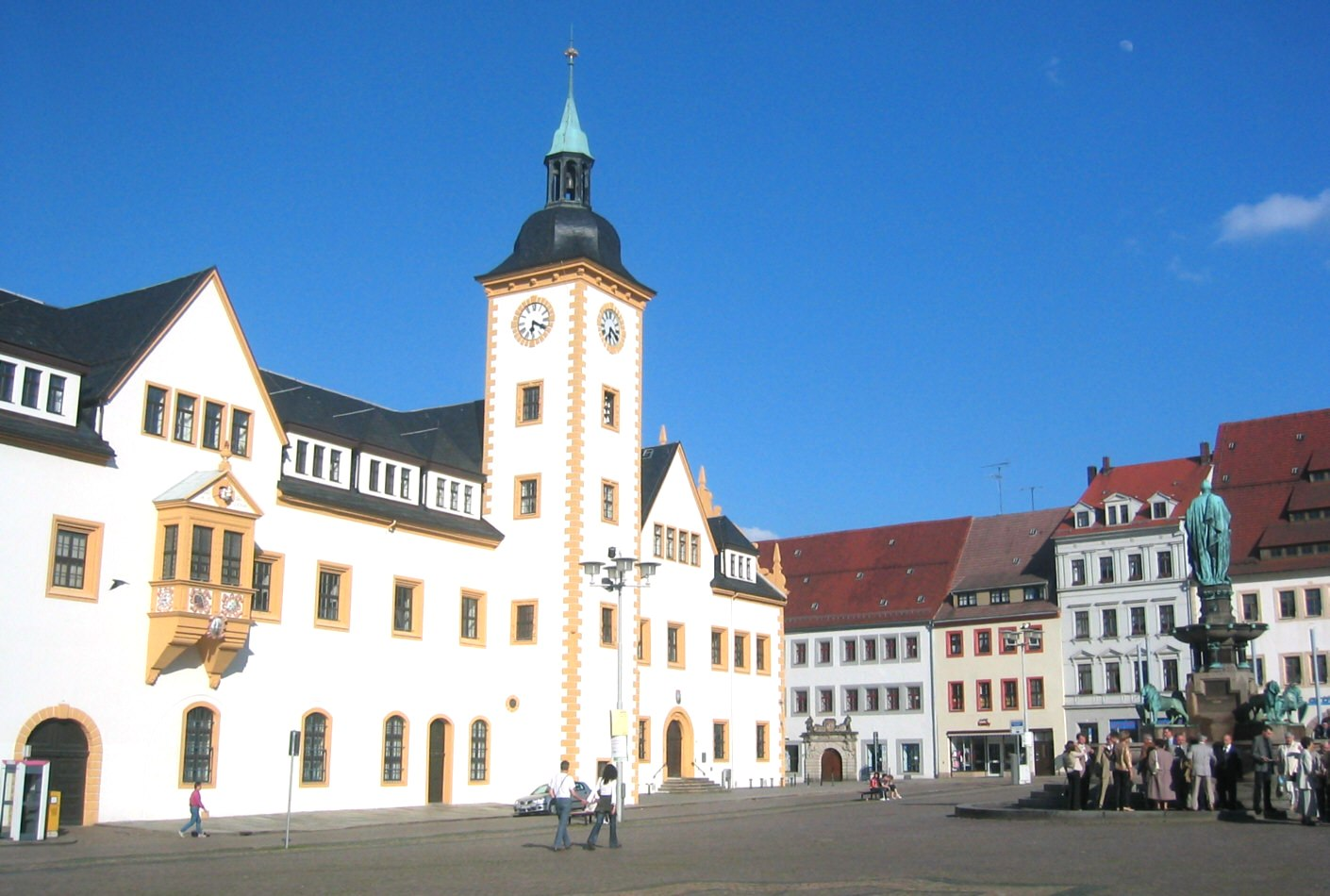
Obermarkt (Upper Market) with Town hall

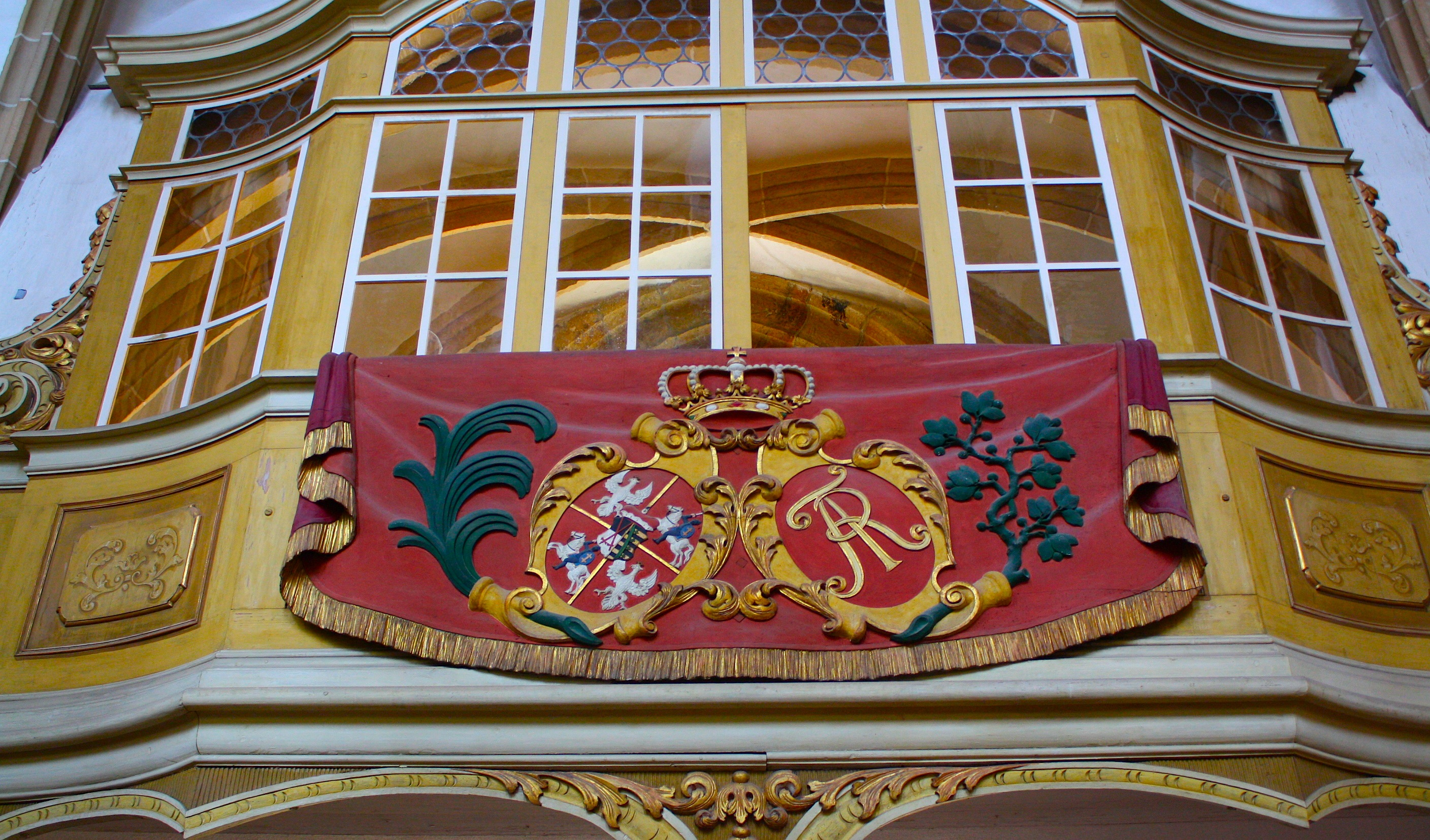
The electoral box of the Polish king Augustus II the Strong in the Freiberg Cathedral

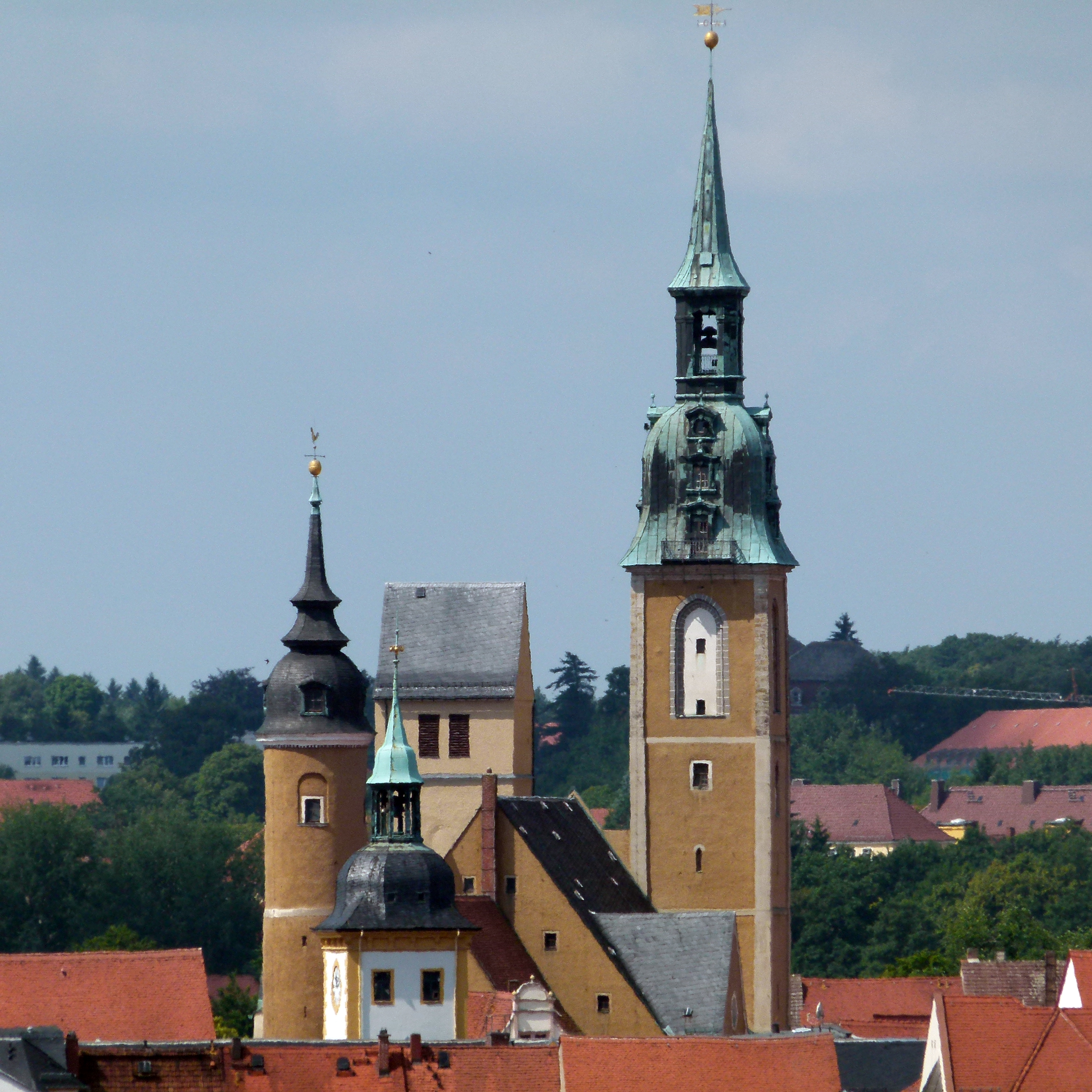
St. Petri church

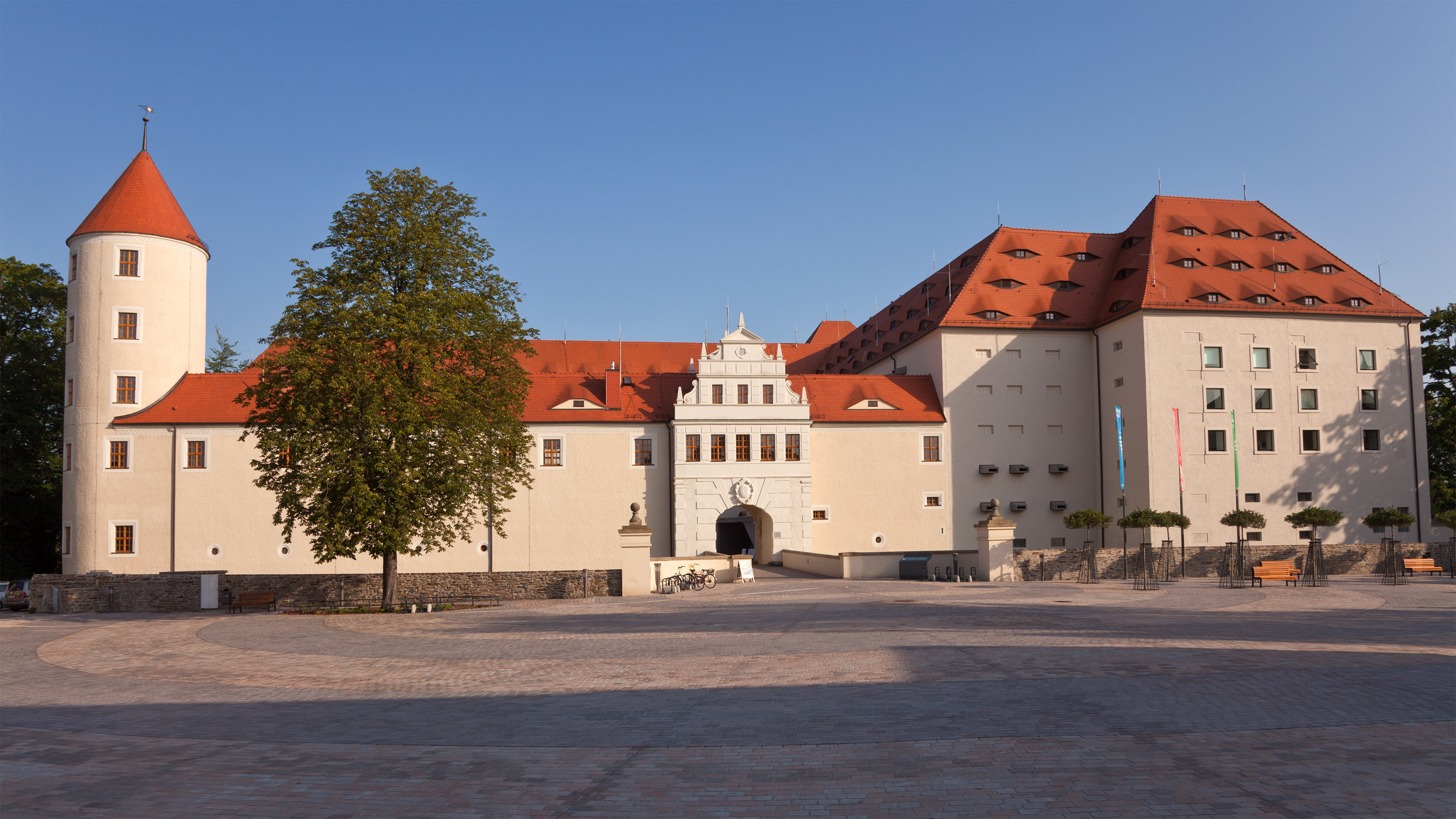
Freudenstein Castle

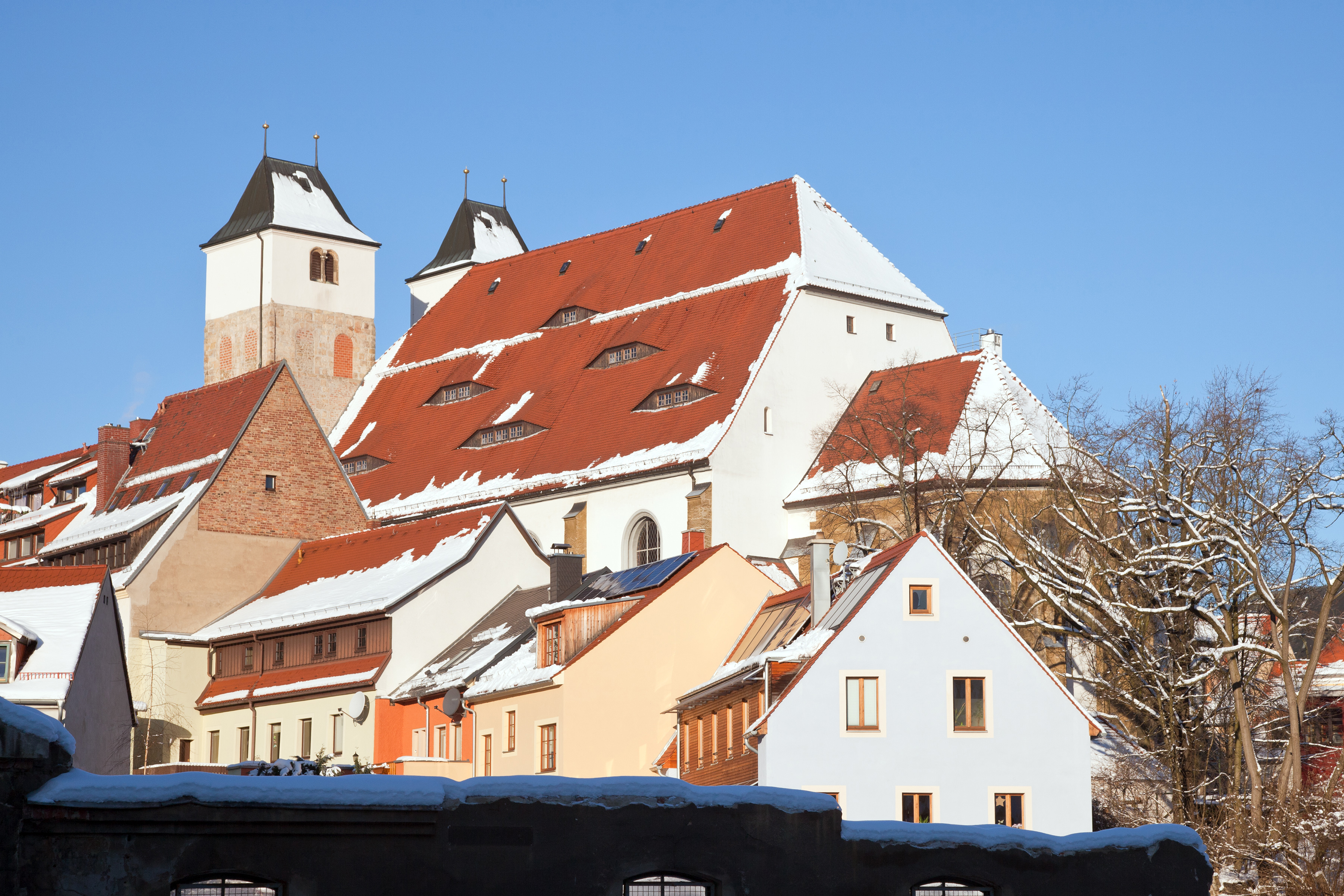
St. Nikolas church

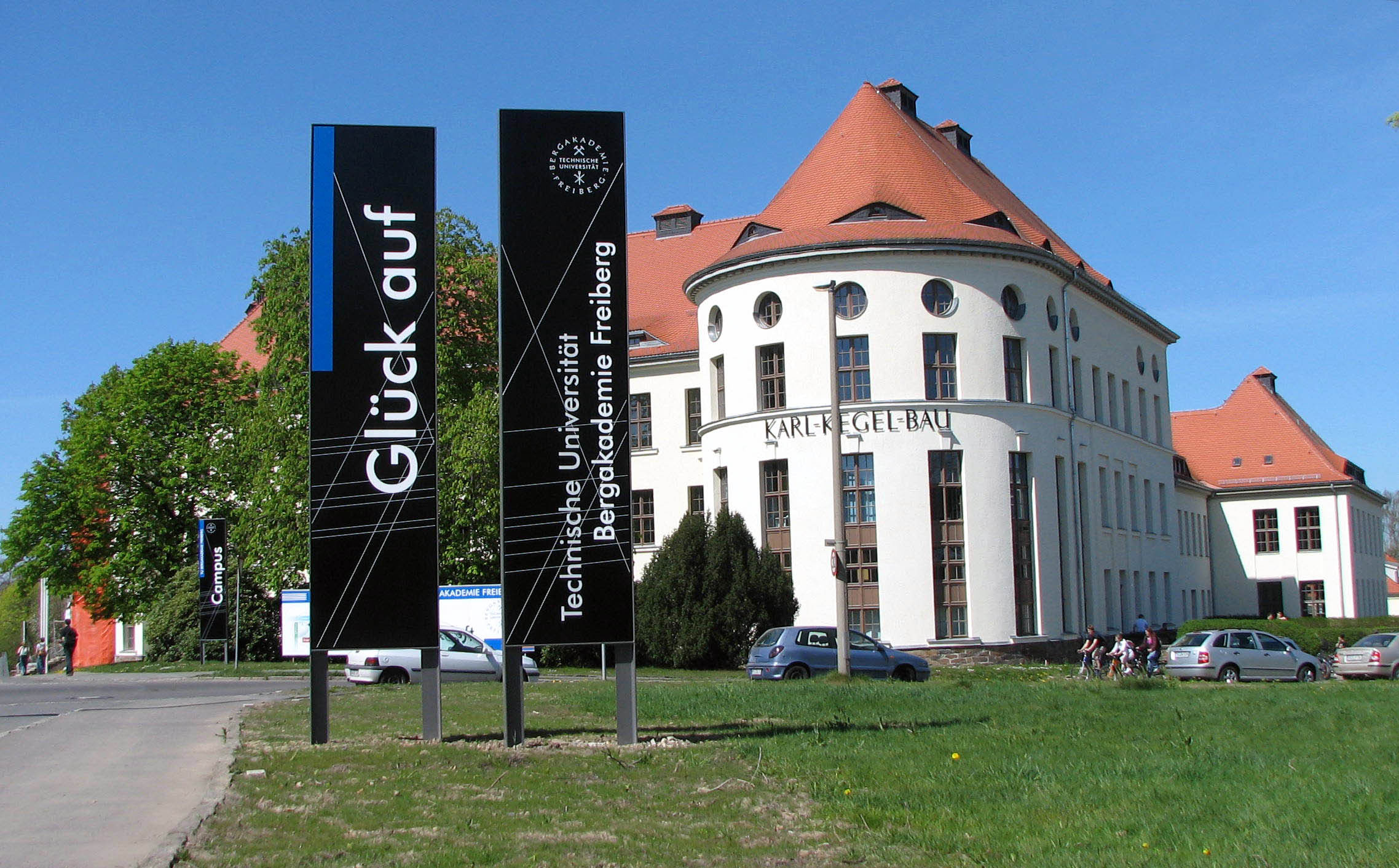
Campus of the TU Bergakademie Freiberg

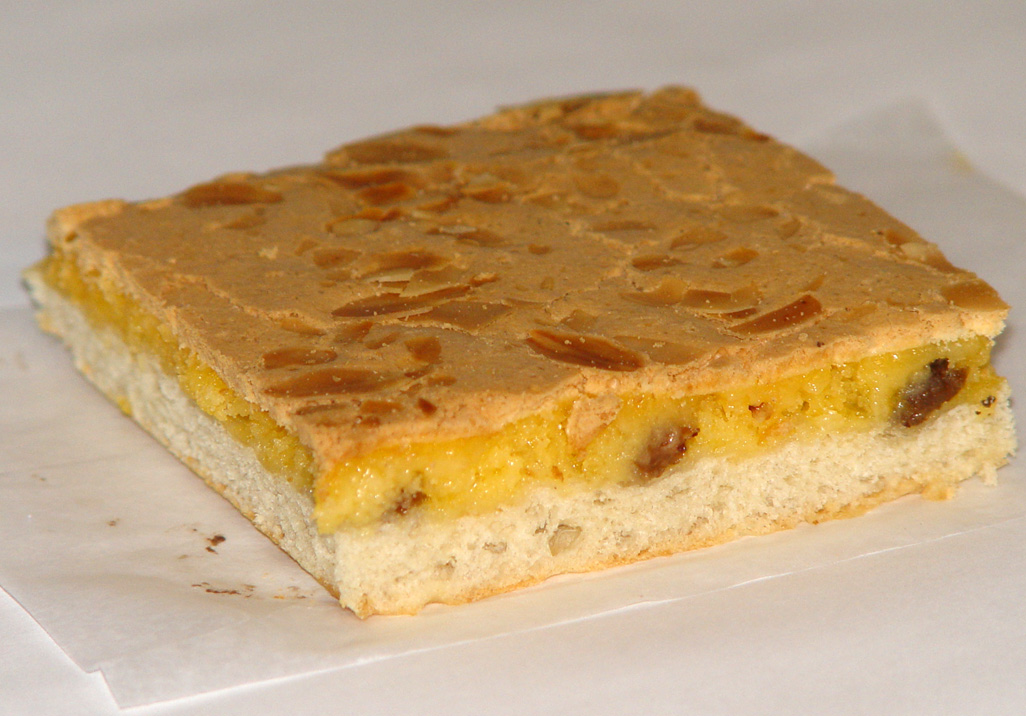
A Freiberg Eierschecke cake

== Twin towns – sister cities ==
Freiberg is twinned with:

- Clausthal-Zellerfeld, Germany (1995)
- Darmstadt, Germany (1990)
- Delft, Netherlands (1986)
- Gentilly, France (1960)
- Ness Ziona, Israel (1996)
- Příbram, Czech Republic (1999)
- Wałbrzych, Poland (1999)

== Freemen ==
- 2000 Günter Blobel, biochemist, Nobel Prize 1999
- 2014 Michael Federmann, investor

== Notable people ==
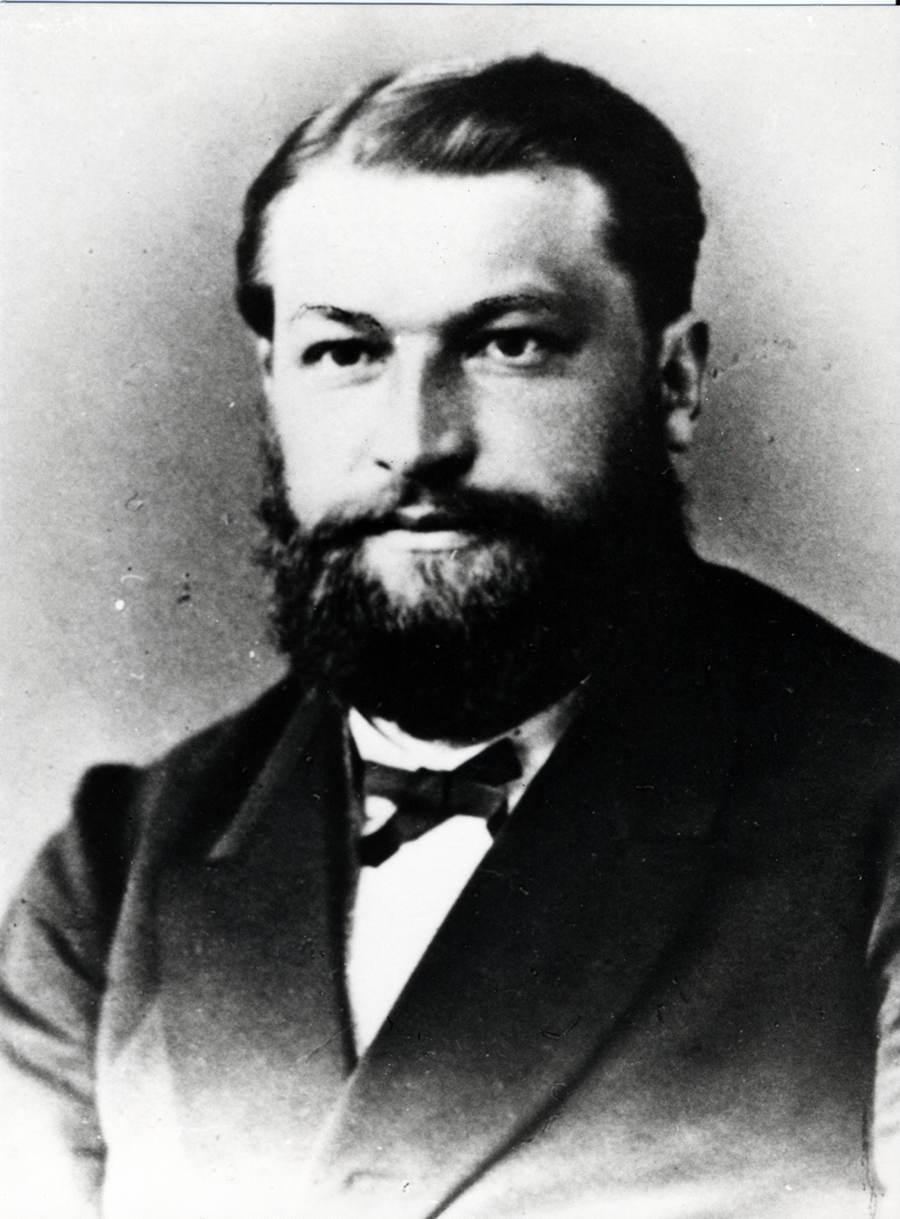
Clemens Winkler 1875

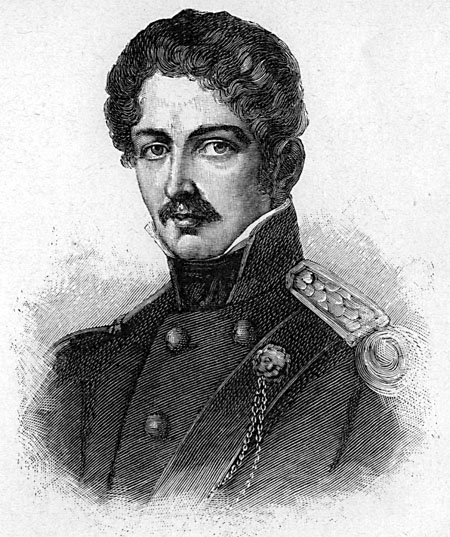
Karl Theodor Körner

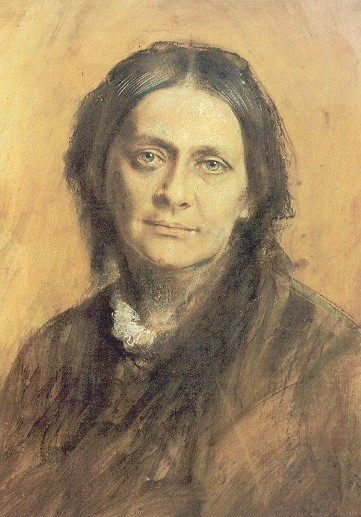
Clara Schumann 1878/1879

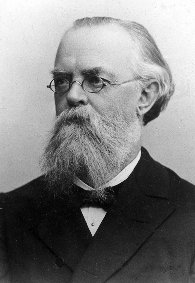
Gustav Zeuner

- Günter Bartusch (1943–1971), motorcycle racer
- August Bebel (1840–1913), politician
- Fritz Bleyl (1880–1966), architect, painter of Expressionism
- Günter Blobel (born 1936), biologist, Nobel laureate, sponsor of the reconstruction of neo-historic buildings in Saxony
- Kwasi Boakye (1827–1904), from Ashanti, Dutch mining engineer, student in Freiberg (also: Boachi)
- Johann Friedrich August Breithaupt (1791–1873), mineralogist
- Leopold von Buch (1774–1853), geologist
- Hans Carl von Carlowitz (1645–1714), Saxon Oberberg Chief
- Christoph Demantius (1567–1643), composer
- Rolf Emmrich (1910–1974), internist and university teacher
- Ulf Fink (1942-2025), politician (CDU)
- Theodoric of Freiberg (c. 1250–c. 1311), theologian, philosopher and physicist who gave an accurate explanation for the rainbow
- Johann Wolfgang von Goethe (1749–1832), natural scientist, writer and statesman
- Alexander von Humboldt (1769–1859), naturalist and explorer
- Friedrich Robert Helmert (1843–1917), surveyor, mathematician, the Helmert transformation is named after him, it is the chi-squared distribution attributed
- Herbert Jobst (1915–1990), writer
- Helmut Kirchberg (1906–1983), mining scientist
- Theodor Körner (author) (1791–1813), poet, freedom fighter
- Wilhelm August Lampadius (1772–1842), metallurgist, chemist
- Friedrich Mohs (1773–1839), mineralogist, creator of the Mohssche Härteskala
- Carl Friedrich Naumann (1797–1873), geologist
- Novalis (1772–1801), poet
- Max Roscher (1888–1940), politician, Reichstag deputy
- Bernd Schröder (born 1942), football coach
- Clara Schumann (1819–1896), pianist
- Gottfried Silbermann (1683–1753), organ builder
- Alfred Wilhelm Stelzner (1840–1895), geologist
- Christian Heinrich Spiess (1755–1799), actor, playwright and author, co-founder of the Gothic novel
- Emil von Sydow (1812–1873), officer, geographer and cartographer
- André Tanneberger (born 1973), known as ATB, trance DJ
- Jakob Ullmann (born 1958), composer and university lecturer
- Karl Eduard Vehse (1802-1870), historian
- Robert Volkmann (1815–1883), composer
- Christian Leopold von Buch (1774–1853), geologist
- Bernhard von Cotta (1808–1879), geologist
- Kunz von Kaufungen (1410–1455), abductor of the Saxon Princes Albrecht and Ernst, executed in Freiberg
- Eberhard Wächtler (1929–2010), economic historian
- Julius Weisbach (1806–1871), mathematician and engineer
- Abraham Gottlob Werner (1749–1817), co-founder of the modern geoscience
- Jacob Benjamin Wiesner Heckerin (1758–1842), metallurgist, expand the mining practices to Latin America, economic supporter of Colombian independence
- Clemens Winkler (1838–1904), chemist, discoverer of germanium
- Johann Heinrich Zedler (1706–1751), bookseller and publisher
- Gustav Zeuner (1828–1907), engineer

== Notes and references ==
- Cziborra, Pascal. KZ Freiberg. Geheime Schwangerschaft. Lorbeer Verlag. Bielefeld. 2008. ISBN 978-3-938969-05-2
