= Wiesner =

Wiesner is a German surname. Notable people with the surname include:

- Alexander Wiesner (born 1989), German politician
- Bernd Wiesner, skydiver who competed for the SC Dynamo Hoppegarten/ Sportvereinigung (SV) Dynamo
- Bertold Wiesner (1901–1972), doctor involved in early developments of urine test for pregnancy and techniques for artificial insemination
- David Wiesner (born 1956), American author and illustrator of children's books and publications
- Ernst Wiesner (1890–1971), modernist architect
- Ferdinand Wiesner, Austrian luger who competed in the late 1920s
- Günter Wiesner, German judo athlete
- Jacob Benjamin Wiesner(1763--1842), German mineralogist and engineer.
- Jerome Wiesner (1915–1994), educator, a Science Advisor to U.S. Presidents Eisenhower, Kennedy and Johnson
- Judith Wiesner (born 1966), former professional tennis player from Austria
- Julius Wiesner (1838–1916), author and professor of botany (standard form Wiesner), Vienna
- Karel Wiesner, Czech-Canadian chemist
- Kate Wiesner, American footballer
- Ken Wiesner (1925–2019), American athlete who competed mainly in the high jump
- Ljubo Wiesner (1885–1951), Croatian poet
- Paul Wiesner (1855–1930), German sailor who competed in the 1900 Summer Olympics
- Stephen Wiesner (1942-2021), research physicist
- Tom Wiesner (1939–2002), American politician and businessman
- Tomáš Wiesner (born 1997), Czech footballer
- Ulla Wiesner (born 1941), German singer from Munich

== See also ==
- Wiesner building houses the MIT Media Lab, the Center for Bits and Atoms and the List Visual Arts Center
- Wiessner
