= Fell Exhibition Slate Mine =

Slate mine in Germany now a museum

Coordinates: 49°45′21.17″N 6°47′56.70″E

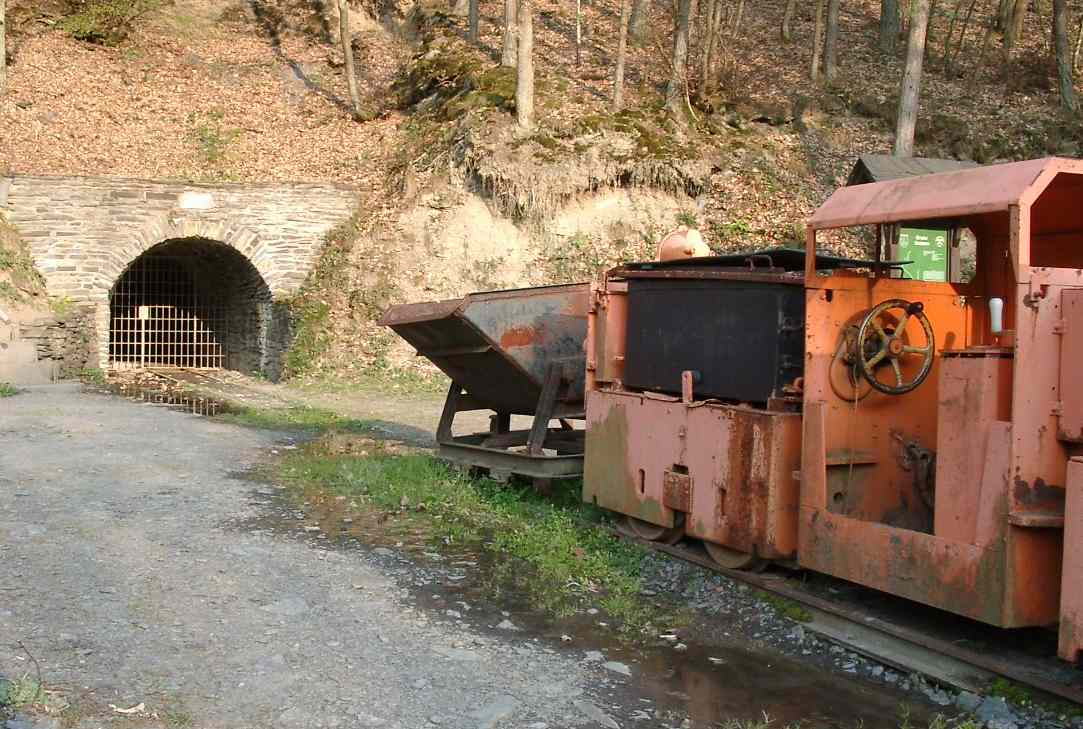
Fell slate mine

The Fell Exhibition Slate Mine in Rhineland-Palatinate, Germany

The Fell Exhibition Slate Mine (German: Besucherbergwerk Fell), also known as the Barbara-Hoffnung Exhibition Mine, is a former slate mine in Germany located about 20km east of Trier and about 60km east of Luxembourg City near the villages of Fell and Thomm. The exhibition mine is open to visitors every day from April to October. It consists of two roof slate mines from the early 20th century that are situated one above the other, a slate mining trail, and a mining museum.

== Special attractions ==
=== Mine underground ===
Firefighter training in the Barbara Mine

The Barbara-Hoffnung Exhibition Mine in the Nossern Valley, between Fell and Thomm, consists of two typical roof slate mines from the turn of the century, situated one above the other. The upper gallery, Hoffnung ("Hope"), was first mentioned in documents dating from 1850, and the lower gallery, Barbara, in documents dating from 1908. Both mines are connected by 100 meters of stairwell.

Beginning in 1994, the Fell community, aided by public support (including grants from the European Community), has worked to restore two former roofing slate mines in Fell and convert them into an exhibition mine. In the course of these developments, two mines, the Barbara Mine, which is situated approximately 25 meters higher than the second, Hoffnung (Hope), were connected by a sloped tunnel. Driving was initiated from the Barbara stoping level and leads to the fourth chamber of the Hope Mine.

The exhibition mine was opened to the public in 1997. Visitors can extensively tour tunnels, drifts, imposing chambers, chutes and pack walls. Figures on display in the mine illustrate the difficult and dangerous work of slate miners.

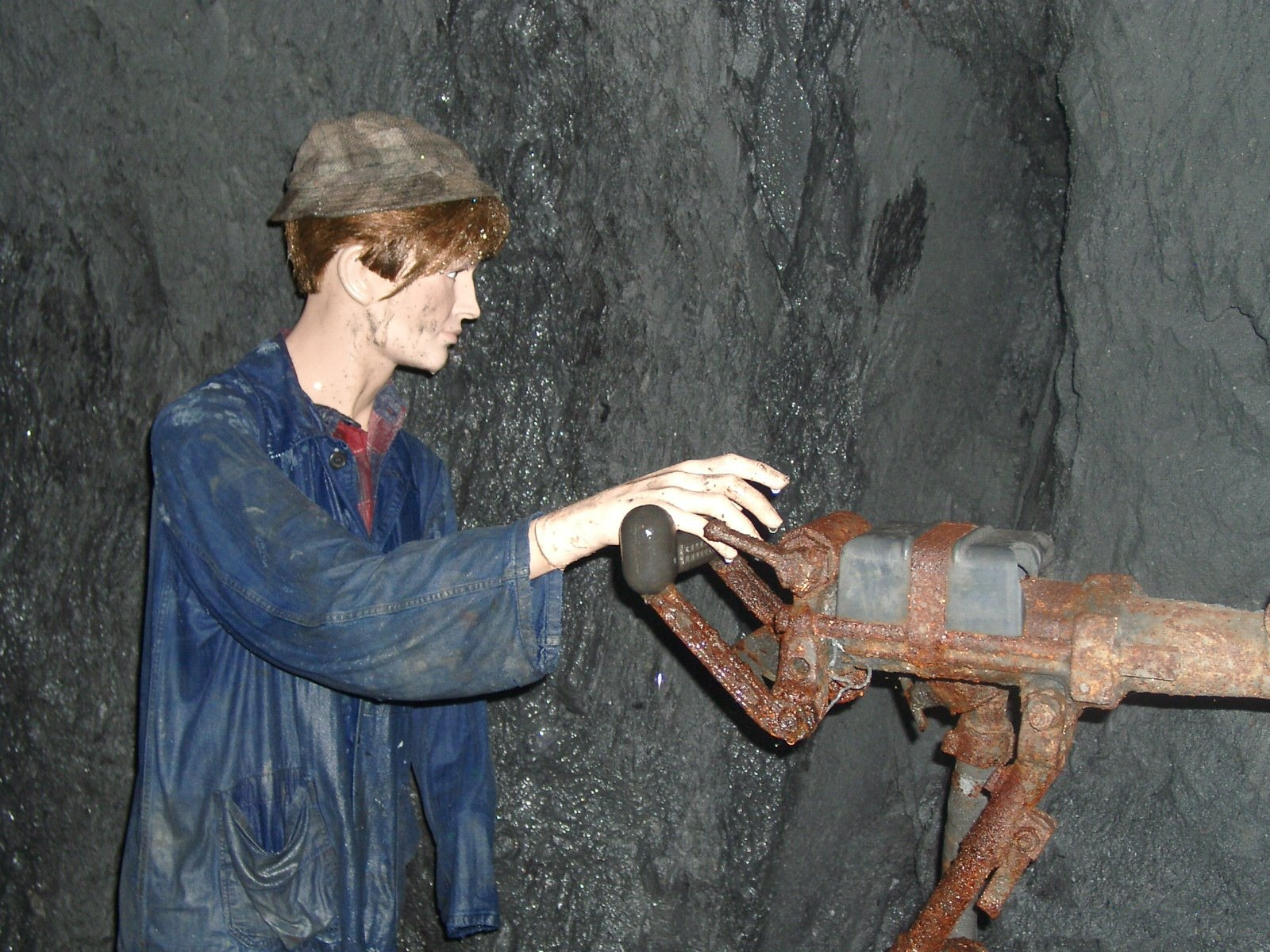
Fell slate mine

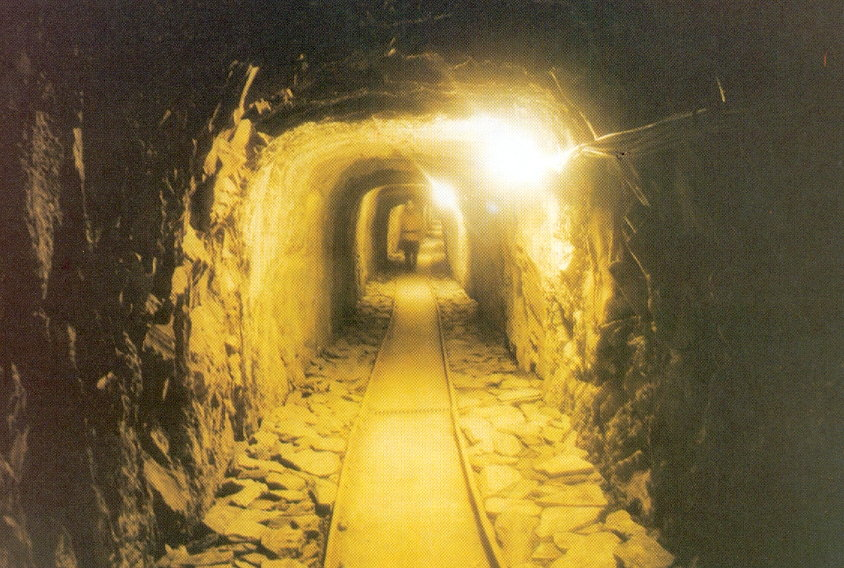
Fell slate mine - Hoffnung Pit

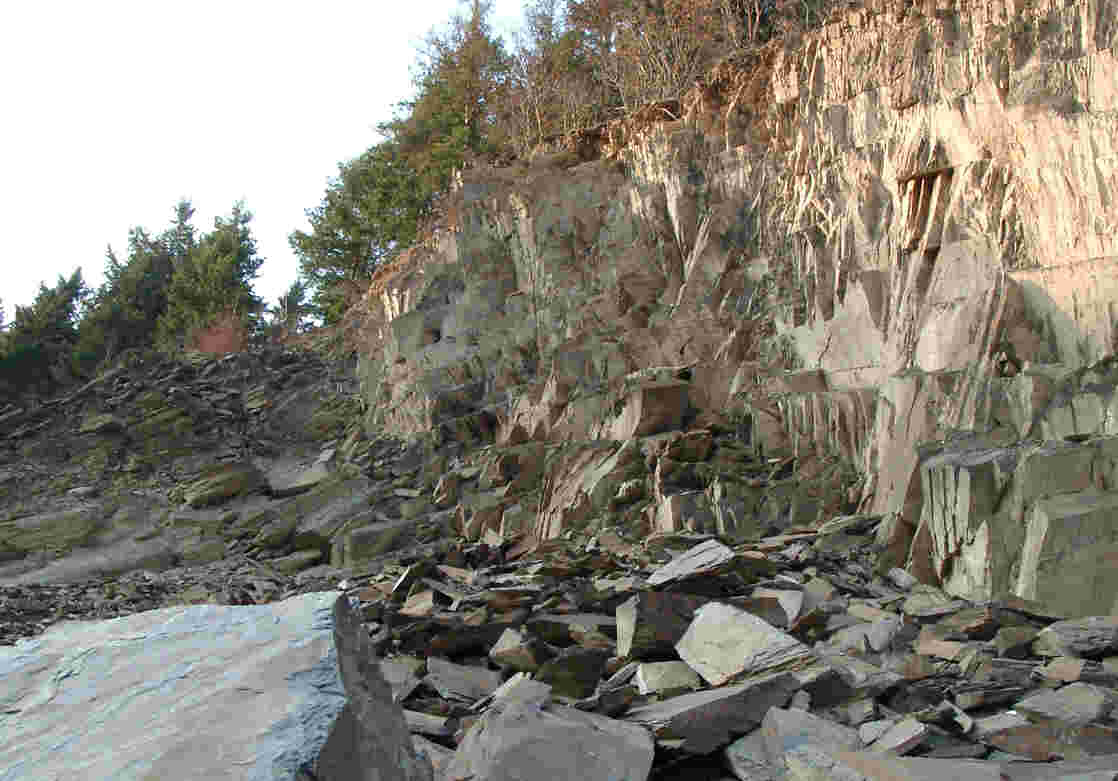
Vogelsberg Quarry

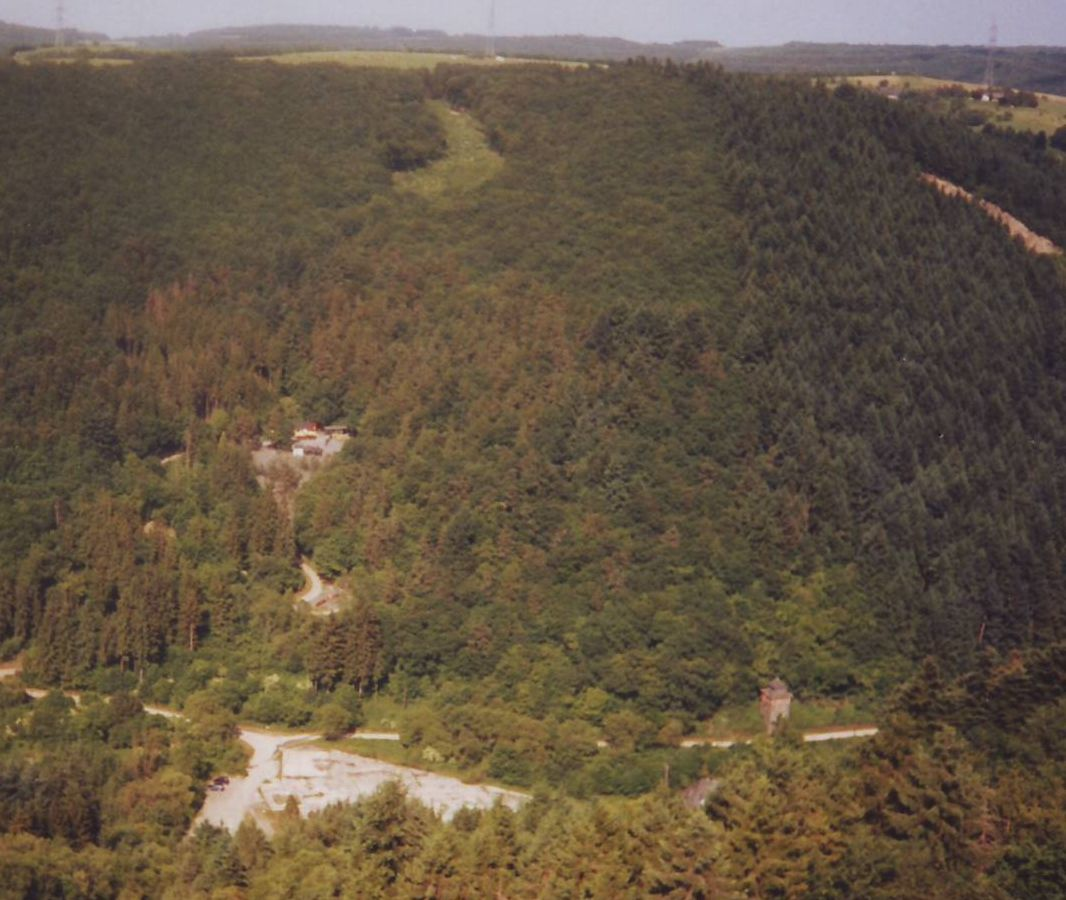
Fell slate mine (upper left) and the formerly concrete block work (down)

=== The slate mining trail ===
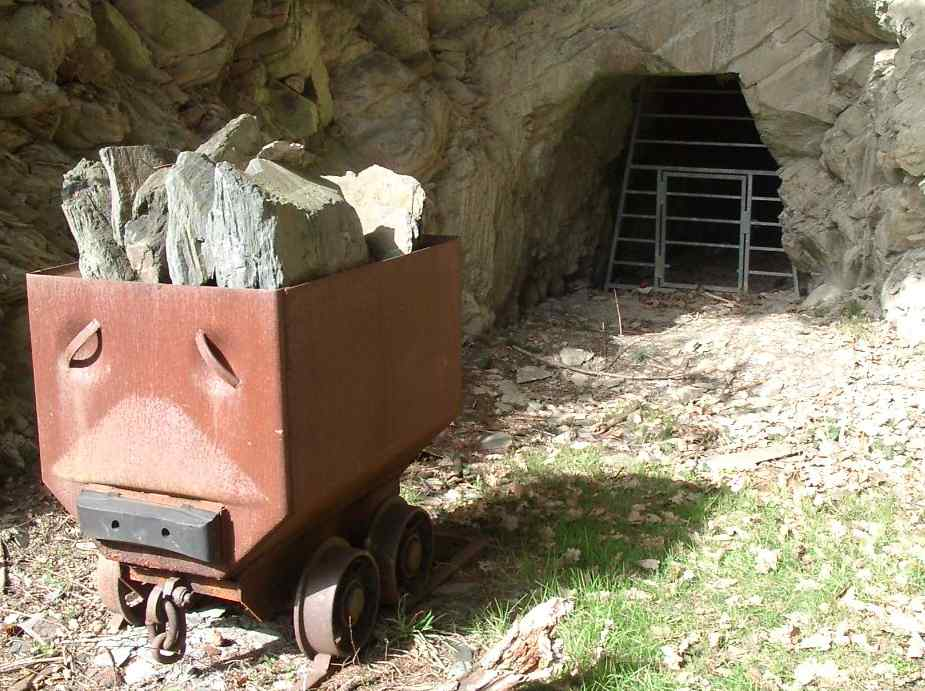
Slate mine trail.

The trail leads through the Nossern Valley, past relics of historic slate mining such as terraced dumps, antique mine cars, trails formerly used to transport the slate, and entry tunnels, now almost completely overgrown.

The layout of the Slate Mining Trail is designed to allow individuals to plan a route best suited to their interest and physical fitness.

In front of the entry tunnels to the mines, ten roofed slate information boards can be found. The slate roofing was donated and completed by the Rathscheck Schieferbergbau company, Mayen.

With the mine map on the information board, visitors can learn about the size and complexity of each mine system, information on the history mine operations, and galleries.

=== Museum mine and wine ===
Adjacent to the exhibition mine, there is a small documentation centre, "Mine and Wine", which exhibits rare slate mining and wine-making tools. A continuous video presentation about modern slate mining in Europe taking place in the Rathscheck slate mine near Mayen. The small museum has statue of Saint Barbara from 1897 on display.

== Traditions ==
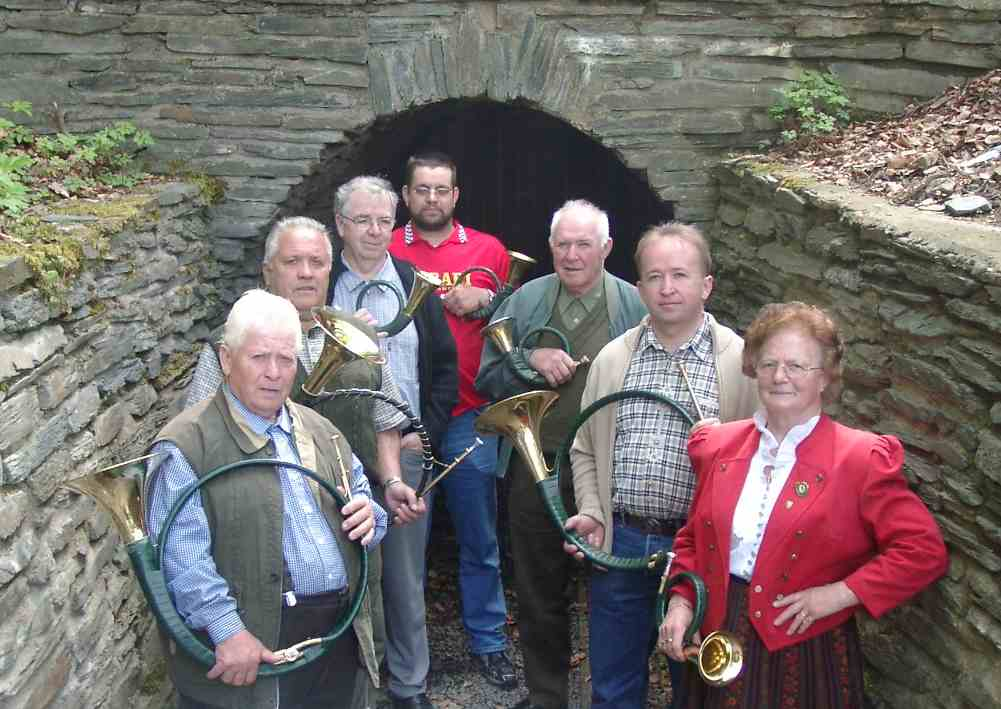
Fell Buglers.

Traditional Mettenschicht (matins in the mine)

The most important bearer of the mining tradition in the former mining towns of Fell and Thomm are the Fell Miners’ Band and the Glück-Auf Thomm Miners' Band, 1927 e.V., both established in 1955, but with a traceable history going back to 1871.

Every year on the second Sunday in Advent (the Sunday following the Saint's Day of Saint Barbara on 4 December) a traditional parade of the Fell Miners’ Band, the Bergparade, takes place.

Every two years in the time leading up to Christmas the Friends of the Exhibition Mine organise a matins in the mine for their members. Participants descend into the mine by the light of candles and pit lamps alone. At specific points in the mine, ex-miners describe their hard work while contemporary witnesses talk about their wartime experiences. They relate to a time, when the mines were bunkers and homes for the citizens of Fell and Thomm. Musical contributions, prayers and poems are presented in honour of St Barbara.
