= Jacob Benjamin Wiesner Heckerin =

German mineralogist and engineer

- Born: June 20, 1763; Freiberg, Dresden, Electorate of Saxony
- Died: August 12, 1842 (aged 79); Zipaquirá, Cundinamarca, Colombia
- Citizenship: Germany; Colombia
- Education: Mines and Metallurgy
- Alma mater: Technische Universität Bergakademie Freiberg
- Occupations: physicist, chemist, mathematic, mineralogist and engineer
- Known for: Mineralogist & engineering work Appointed as General Director of mines by Simon Bolivar
- Notable work: Map of Sesquilé Mine; Underground Tunnels of Zipaquirá salt mine engineering work to drain the Guatavita Lake
- Children: 10
- Parents: Johan Christian Christiansen Wiesner (father); Johane Dorotea Hackerin (mother)
- Family: Wiesner family

Jacob Benjamin Wiesner Heckerin (20 June 1763 – 12 August 1842) was a German physicist, chemist, mathematician, mineralogist and engineer born in Freiberg, Saxony, Germany. Wiesner travelled to the Americas after King Charles III of Spain requested the efforts of skilled German mineralogists and engineers. He discovered iron ores in Pacho and, by order of Antonio Nariño, searched for lead mines. Wiesner supported the Colombian independence efforts, and as a result, Simón Bolívar appointed him as the General Director of Mines at the Zipaquirá and Sesquilé salt mines. Wiesner is also known for draining the Guatavita lagoon between 1822 and 1823.

== Early life, family and education ==
Wiesner was baptized in the parish of Santa Virginia on June 28, 1763, the son of Christian Wiessner and Juana Dorotea Hacker, natives of Freiberg, Germany. He studied mines and metallurgy and graduated from his hometown's renowned university, the Technische Universität Bergakademie Freiberg.

In 1787, King Charles III of Spain asked the Elector of Saxony for several skilled mineralogists to teach their profession and work in the mines of the New Kingdom of Granada (now part of Colombia). Eight young men were sent, including Wiesner.

== Work ==
In September 1788, the mineralogists arrived in Cartagena de Indias and went to the Santa Ana silver mines near the city of Mariquita, to be employed by the Director General of Mines, Juan José D'Elhuyart. At that time, the German Baron de Born had discovered a new method of refining metals with practical applications to separate trace amounts of gold within silver. The Spanish chemist Faustino D'Elhuyart, brother of Juan José, had studied this method, as did the new arrivals, and they applied it at the Bogotá Mint. Before D'elhuyart's death, Wiesner worked alongside him. In 1792, Wiesner went to Pamplona, where an anonymous company had been formed to exploit a silver mine in that province and a gold mine in Girón.

Wiesner's departure left the Santa Ana mine almost abandoned, and as it was the mine that provided metals to the Bogotá Mint, when the cupellation declined, poor coins began to be manufactured there, as Boussingault noted in his famous Memoirs in 1825. In Girón, the gold produced there was considered to be more valuable. While Wiesner was working in Girón, on July 1, 1802, he married Ignacia Arriaga y Quesada. The couple had nine children. The Wiesner family is one of many German families that emigrated to Colombia. By the 19th and 20th centuries, they had established themselves as a prominent family in Zipaquirá and in the Colombian aristocracy. Wiesner's descendants have served the country as government ministers, lawyers, engineers and doctors.

In 1797, when the anonymous mining company was dissolved, Wiesner went on to work in Girón's silver mines, which were owned by the royal treasury. In 1801, Wiesner's countryman, Baron Alexander von Humboldt, recommended that the authorities take advantage of Wiesner's services, especially in the excavation of the closed Zipaquirá rock salt mine. In his Memoir, Humboldt noted that German mineralogists earned their salaries at Honda, but had little to achieve, and they would be better employed as Wiesner's assistants. In 1806, this recommendation convinced the government to assign Wiesner to inspect the Zipaquirá salt mine. Wiesner could begin to excavate after delivering a report, which he presented with Official Carlos J. Urisarri. At the same time, Wiesner reviewed the Baja y Veta mine in Sesquilé and mapped it, as well as the Muzo emerald mine. In 1814, by order of President Antonio Nariño, Wiesner explored the Pacho district, discovering several new metal mines, such as a lead mine at San Miguel and a copper mind in Algodonales.

Since lead was required for Bolívar's campaign to liberate New Granada, Wiesner built a furnace and smelted lead, sending it to the government. Later, he also acquired access to iron deposits. In 1816, the Spanish regained control of the country for three years. After the battle of Boyacá, Simon Bolívar was free to enter Bogotá. The Spanish employees of the Zipaquirá mines, upon hearing that the king's armies had been defeated, fled in terror. Their flight left the mine's business office in Wiesner's hands, with a safe full of money, various belongings, weapons, and other valuables.

After the Battle of Boyacá on August 7, Bolívar passed through Zipaquirá where Wiesner was still at the mines. When Bolívar passed through, Wiesner presented him with everything he had in his hands, after which, on September 17, Bolívar appointed him as the General Director of Mines. Following this, Wiesner built underground tunnels to reach deposits in the Zipaquirá salt flats; he also mapped the Sesquilé salt mine.

Between 1822 and 1823, Wiesner directed the drainage of the Guatavita lagoon through a contract with the businessman José Ignacio París. On the 23rd he returned to Pacho to begin construction of an ironworks factory on the authority of the province governor, Cristóbal de Vergara Azcárate y Caycedo. Wiesner built a structure fifty varas long with two rooms at either end, made a furnace and melted down iron ore, but fell ill soon after and returned to Zipaquirá. Years later, Vice President Santander gave Wiesner the job of Director of the Zipaquirá mine and salt factory, where he remained until his retirement. Later in life, Wiesner also dedicated himself to the manufacture of soaps and candles. Wiesner's office was inherited by his son, Pedro Francisco Wiesner Arriaga, and his grandson, Jacobo.

== Scholarly recognition and legacy ==
Jacob Benjamín Wiesner greatly shaped the origins of Colombian metal-mechanic workshops of the 19th century, first through working in the Mariquita mines, then in Pamplona, and later in the Zipaquirá salt flats. His 1814 commission by Antonio Nariño lead to the discovery of lead and rich iron deposits near Pacho.

In Pacho, around 1822, Wiesner installed a medium-sized workshop, where he would eventually start the Pacho Forge. The creation of this workshop influenced metallurgy in Colombia for generations afterward. In the Pacho Forge and later, in the Pradera, Samacá and Amagá forges, Colombian technicians mastered the techniques of the Industrial Revolution. The Pacho Forge, under the stewardship of Jacob Wiesner and the French engineers who succeeded him, became a practical school for steelmaking, iron chemistry, mineralogy, and combustion techniques.

== See also ==
- Salt Cathedral of Zipaquirá
- Guatavita Lake
- Wiesner family
