= Choong-Seock Chang =

US physicist (born 1951)

Choongseok Chang (born 1951) is a retired physicist/professor and has been a long time manager of multiple large scale scientific projects for US Department of Energy. He is also known as CS Chang in the international fusion physics community.

Chang earned an undergraduate degree in Physics from Seoul National University in 1974, and obtained a doctorate degree in Physics at the University of Texas at Austin. After completing his studies in 1979, Chang undertook research at General Atomic in La Jolla and Applied Microwave Plasma Concepts in Carlsbad, California. In 1986, Chang was appointed a professor of physics at the Korea Advanced Institute of Science and Technology, and later held a research professorship at New York University's Courant Institute of Mathematical Sciences from 1988. He became a Managing Principal physicist at Princeton University Princeton Plasma Physics Laboratory in 2011. While at New York University, Chang was elected to fellow of the American Physical Society in 2006, "for seminal and pioneering contributions in neoclassical, rf-driven, and basic transport theories, and for his leadership in plasma edge simulation in toroidal magnetic confinement devices." In 2005, Chang was awarded by US Department of energy the multi-million dollars per year SciDAC (Scientific Discovery through Advanced Computing) project for understanding of nonlinear multiscale boundary physics in tokamak fusion devices, which lasted till 2024. He chaired the 2016 Fusion Energy Sciences Exascale Review committee activities for US Department of Energy. Chang was also the Co-Lead PI of the Exascale Computing Project "WDMApp" from 2016 to 2024.

Chang is winner of the 2024 Kaul Foundation Prize for Excellence in Plasma Physics Research and Technology Development, and recipient of the 2024 Albert Nelson Marquis Lifetime Achievement Award.
