= Jeffrey P. Freidberg =

Jeffrey P. Freidberg was head of the Nuclear Science and Engineering Department at Massachusetts Institute of Technology from 1997 to 2003. He is currently Professor of Nuclear Science and Engineering (Emeritus) at MIT, and a collaborator at NYU's Courant Institute of Mathematical Sciences. He retired as associate director of MIT Plasma Science and Fusion Center and from his academic duties in 2011. He remained involved in the research activities of the PSFC Theory Group and wrote a new textbook on magnetohydrodynamics theory called Ideal MHD that was published in 2014 (a successor to his 1987 book Ideal Magnetohydronamics). He is also author of a book titled Plasma Physics and Fusion Energy first published in 2007, that was based on a series of course notes from MIT graduate courses on plasma physics and fusion energy.

He attended the Polytechnic Institute of Brooklyn (now New York University Tandon School of Engineering) earning a B.S. in electrical engineering in 1961, a M.S. in electrophysics in 1962 and a Ph.D. in electrophysics in 1964.
