= Wiessner =

Wiessner is a surname. Notable people with the surname include:

- Fritz Wiessner (1900–1988), German-American pioneer of free climbing
- Pauline Wiessner (born 1947), American anthropologist
- Siegfried Wiessner (born 1953), American law professor
- John Frederick Wiessner (1831-1897), German-American beer brewer in Baltimore, Maryland

== See also ==
- Weisner, surname
- Weissner, surname
- Weitzner, surname
- Wiesner, surname
