= Münzbach (river) =

River in Germany

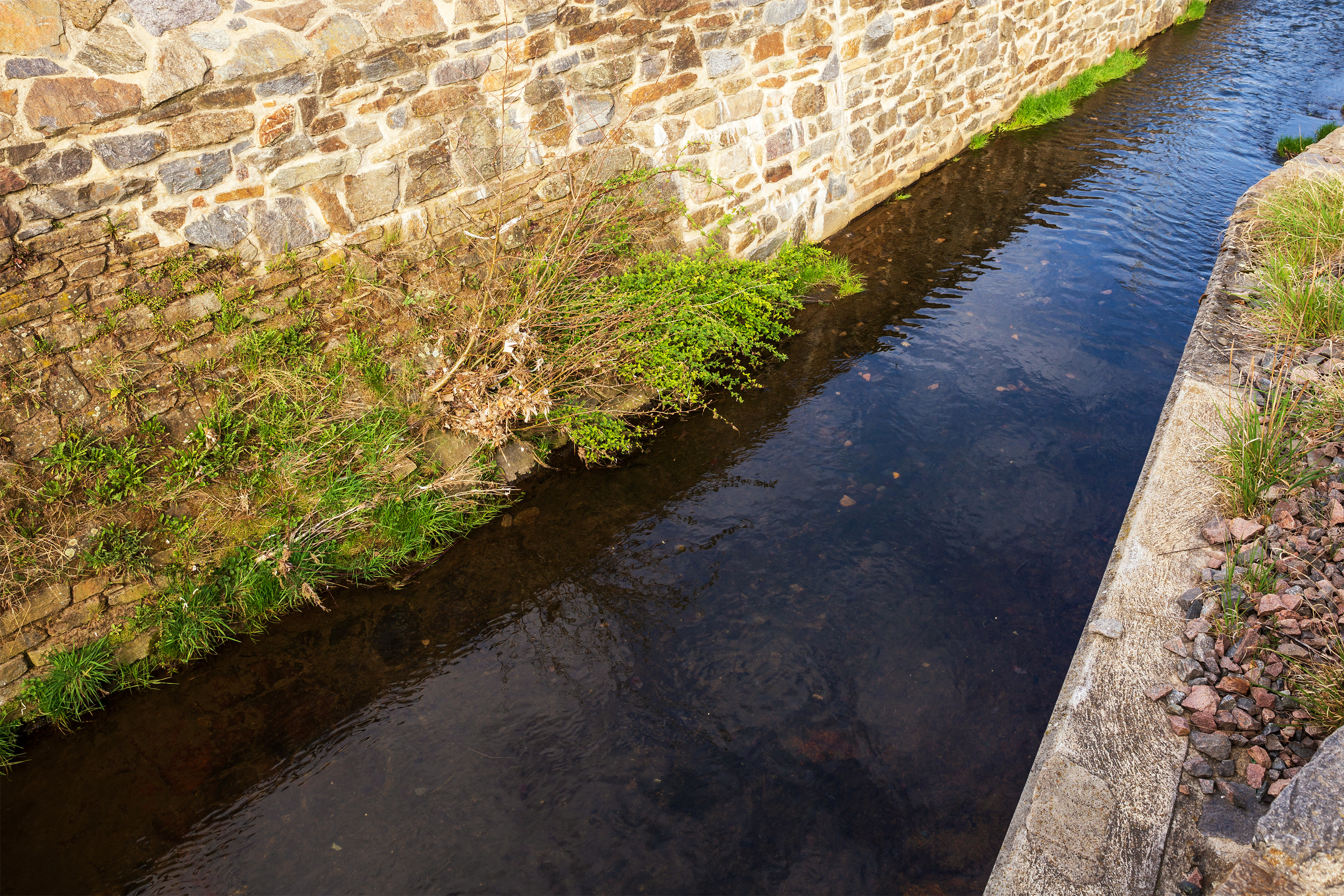

Location
- Country: Germany
- State: Saxony

Physical characteristics
- Mouth
  - location: Freiberger Mulde
  - coordinates: 50.9585°N 13.3303°E

Basin features
- Progression: Freiberger Mulde→ Mulde→ Elbe→ North Sea

The Münzbach (German pronunciation: [ˈmʏntsbax]) is a river of Saxony, Germany. It is a left tributary of the Freiberger Mulde, which it joins near Freiberg, and has a total length of about 18.5 km.”

== See also ==
- List of rivers of Saxony
