= Mettenschicht =

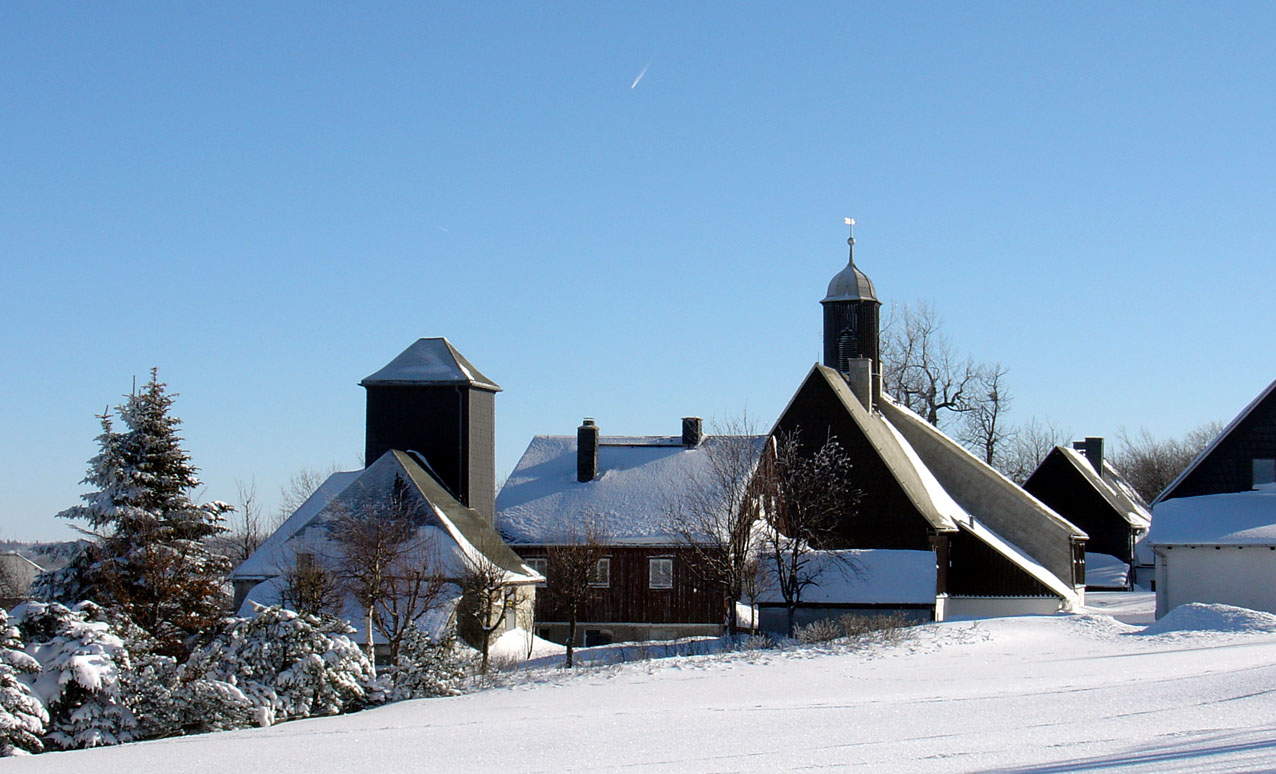
The Huthaus Mining Museum in Zinnwald, Ore Mountains

Mettenschicht in the Fell Exhibition Slate Mine

The Mettenschicht is an old German mining custom in the Ore Mountains. It is the name given to the last shift worked before Christmas, which ends early with a celebration and meal.

== Description ==
Mettenschicht is the main Christmas celebration among miners in the Protestant Ore Mountains; in Catholic mining areas of Germany, St Barbara's Day is more important. It is first recorded in the first half of the 17th century. The Steiger, a foreman or overseer, would finish the pre-Christmas shift early with a knocking signal, "knocking the miners out". Then he would give a sort of sermon in the Huthaus, the administrative building, which was decorated for the occasion. Singing miners' songs such as Der Steiger, the miners would give thanks to God for the products of the mine. A simple, traditional meal ended the shift. The meal usually consisted of bratwurst with mashed potatoes and sauerkraut as well as herbed schnapps and a cigar (gaahlem Gelecht). Also common are glühwein, tea and bacon-fat butterbrot.

The idea of the Mettenschicht has spread from the Ore Mountains to many exhibition mines as an idea for a Christmas celebration with elements of mining tradition. They vary from end-of-year celebrations focusing on strict historical authenticity, often held in the mine itself, attended by sponsors, friends, and in many cases honorary officials of the mine, through incentive events for which tickets are sold, to mining folk events put on in the city hall for bus tours.

== External sources ==
- Bernd Lahl. Mettenschichten im Erzgebirge: Geschichte, Berichte, Geschichten. Marienberg: Druck- und Verlagsgesellschaft Marienberg, 2001, ISBN 3-931770-35-4 (in German)
- Richard Truckenbrodt. "Erzgebirgsweihnacht". Glückauf 49 (1929), pp. 254–55. (in German)
- Werner Unger. "Mettenschichten und Glückauf-Abende - Vom Ursprung weihnachtlicher Lichtelabende". Erzgebirgische Heimatblätter 6/1980, pp. 130–33, ISSN 0232-6078 (in German)
