= Miner's apron =

Protective clothing worn by miners

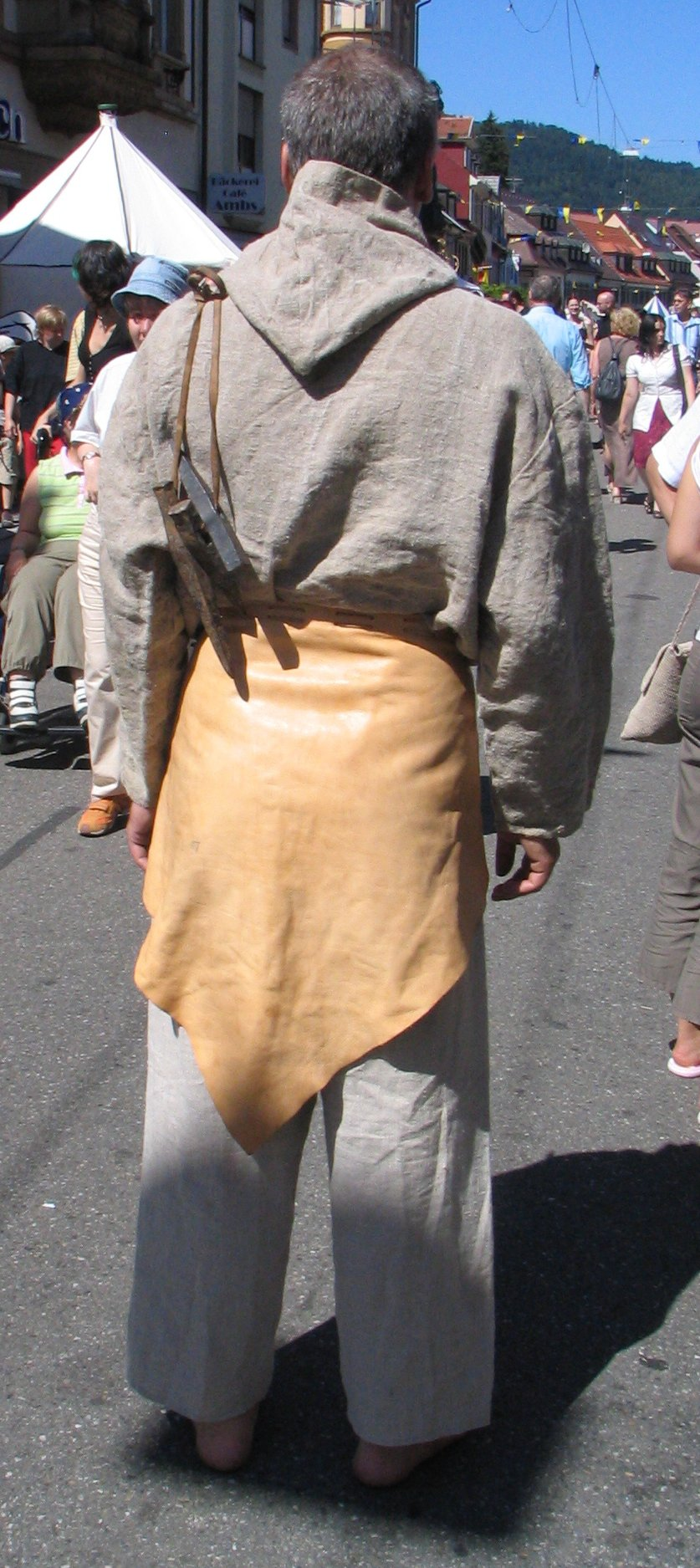
Miner's costume showing the miner's apron or Bergleder

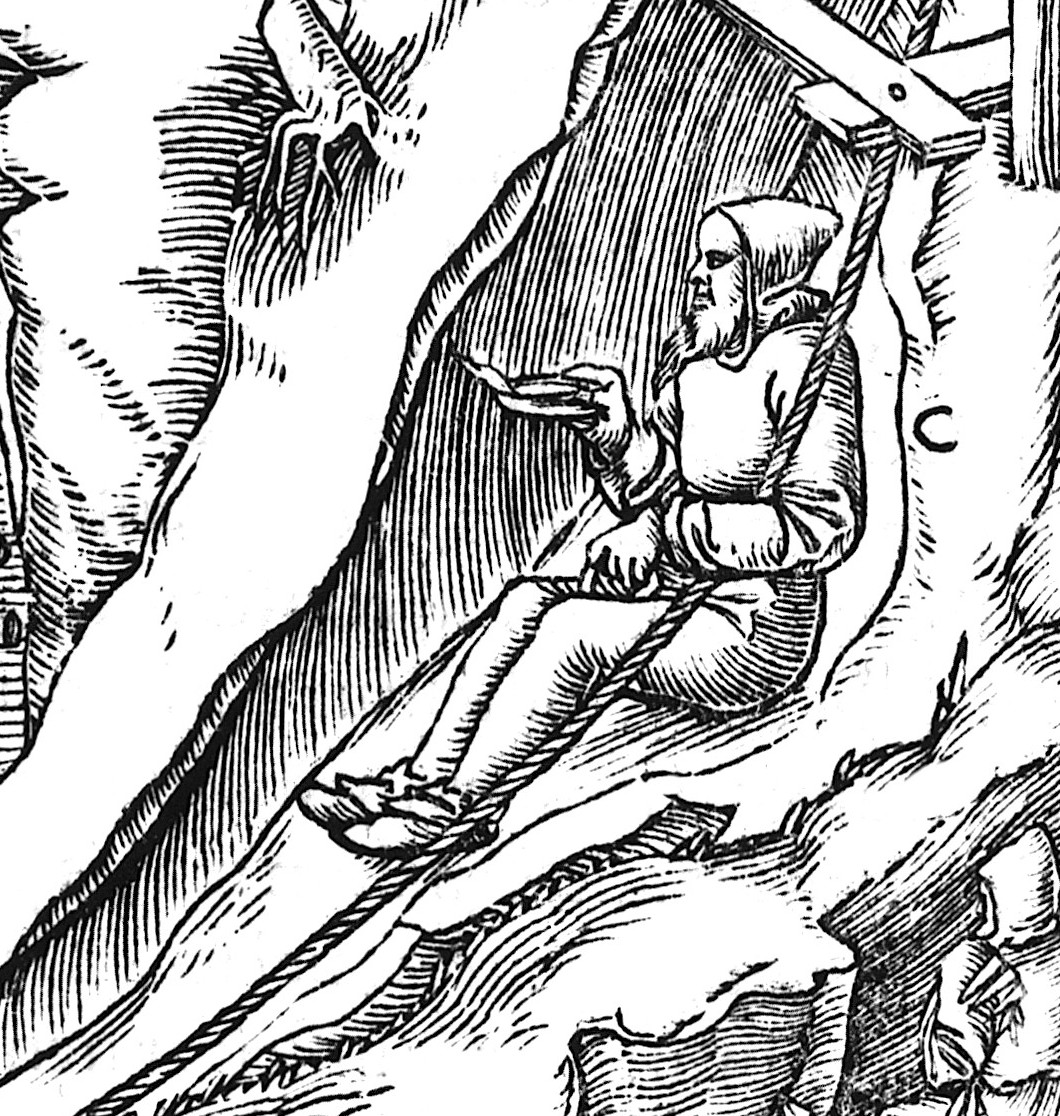
Miner entering a mine sitting on his apron (by Georg Agricola)

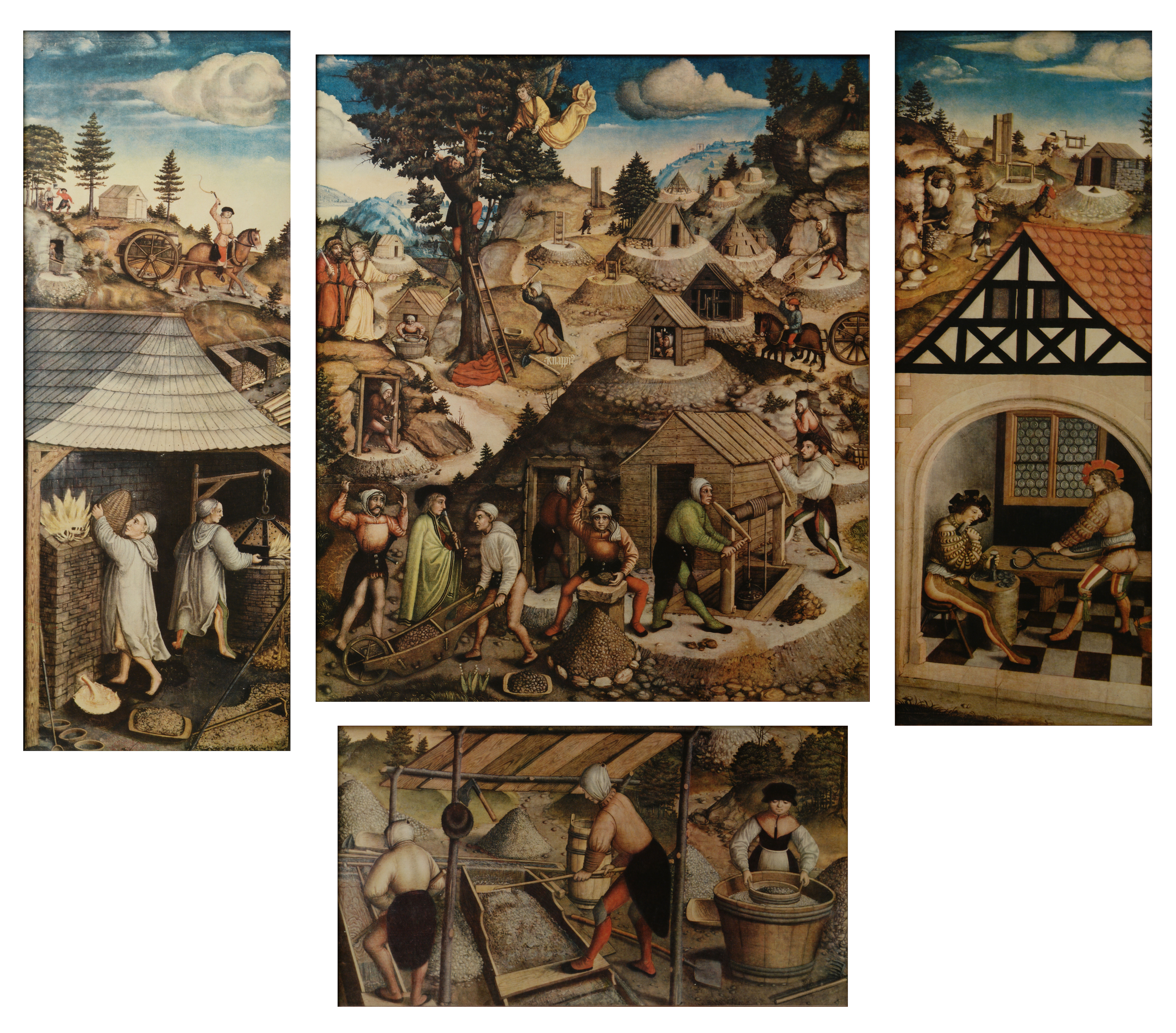
Depiction of miners with aprons at the Annaberg Miners' Altar (1521)

The miner's apron (German: Arschleder, Bergleder or Fahrleder) is part of the clothing worn, especially historically, by miners in the mining industries of German-speaking Europe. Variously called in English a miner's apron, a miner's after-apron, breech leather or miner's leather apron, it was a leather apron that served to keep the seat of the trousers from wearing out when working or moving around the mine (Fahrung) as well as keeping out the cold and moisture when sitting. It also provided protection especially when entering inclined mineshafts. Another advantage was that it stabilised the internal organs from mechanical shock and vibration by acting as a sort of kidney belt. The miner's apron was a triangular or, more rarely, semi-circular piece of leather and was supported by the body belt. In Germany the design of the modern miner's apron is governed by DIN standard 23307 Gesäßleder für den Bergbau (Arschleder).

== History ==
The mining apron was introduced to German mining regions in the 15th century from the Slovakian mining area around Schemnitz (Banská Štiavnica). Early illustrations of it are found on the title page of the "Little Mining Book" (Bergbüchlein) by Ulrich Rülein von Calw (1505) and on the miner's altar of St. Anne's Church in Annaberg (1521). Georgius Agricola wrote in this book De re metallica (1556):

So sat the miners on their aprons, which were tied around their loins, and hung down behind them.
(So sitzend die Berghäwer auf ihr Arsleder, das um die Lenden gebunden, dahinter herabhanget.)

Permission to wear the miner's apron was only granted to miners and mining officials. Analogous to the hammer and pick, it represented a unifying symbol of miners' status. Later, it was also worn outside work in decorative styles as part of the miner's uniform (Berghabit) or parade uniform (Paradeuniform) for miners' parades (Bergparaden). In events connected with mining customs, this device is also used for the so-called "leather jump" (Ledersprung), a form of miners' initiation ceremony in Austria.

== Folk art and music ==
The apron of the miner is incorporated into the design of the wooden smoking figurines and nutcrackers made in the Ore Mountains. It has also made its way into the mining songs. Thus we read in the last stanza of the version of the mine foremen's song (Steigerlied) sung in the Ruhr and Saar:

The mining folk are terribly good folk
because they wear the leather over their bum at night
because they wear the leather over their bum at night
and drink schnaps, and drink schnaps.
Die Bergleut sein kreuzbrave Leut’
denn sie tragen das Leder vor dem Arsch bei der Nacht
denn sie tragen das Leder vor dem Arsch bei der Nacht
und saufen Schnaps, und saufen Schnaps.

== Similar uses ==
In stunt kite flying the leather apron is used especially in power kiting or kite surfing using powered kites. The pilot sits on a leather apron that protects the seat of his trousers and is hauled by the kite over rough ground (e.g., pastureland).

== See also ==
- Miner's habit
- Miner's cap
- Mooskappe

== Literature ==
- Walter Schellhas: Das Arschleder des Bergmanns, in: Sächsische Heimatblätter Heft 6/1987, pp. 280–281
- Carl Friedrich Richter: Neuestes Berg-und Hütten-Lexikon. 1st Volume, Kleefeldsche Buchhandlung, Leipzig, 1805
