= Gezähe =

Miner's toolset

Hammer and pick: mining tools and the symbol of mining

In German-speaking countries, the miner's toolset is known as a Gezähe (derived from gizouuun, zu zawen, gezawen – to be usable, advantageous) formerly also abbreviated to Gezäh. It is a set of personally-owned mining tools and equipment needed by the miner in his daily work.

In coal mining in central Europe during the 19th and 20th centuries, every miner had his own set of tools. So that they could not be stolen, before the end of his shift they were either locked in a tool chest (Gezähekiste) or threaded onto a tool ring (Gezähering) which was then locked. To that end, all tools had a hole or eyelet. Tools that were not part of a miner's personal equipment and were only needed now and then, could be issued to the miner in the tool store (Gezähekammer or Magazin) in return for a token (Gezähemarke). Most tools were marked with a number, which was either stamped or welded to the tool.

== Typical implements ==
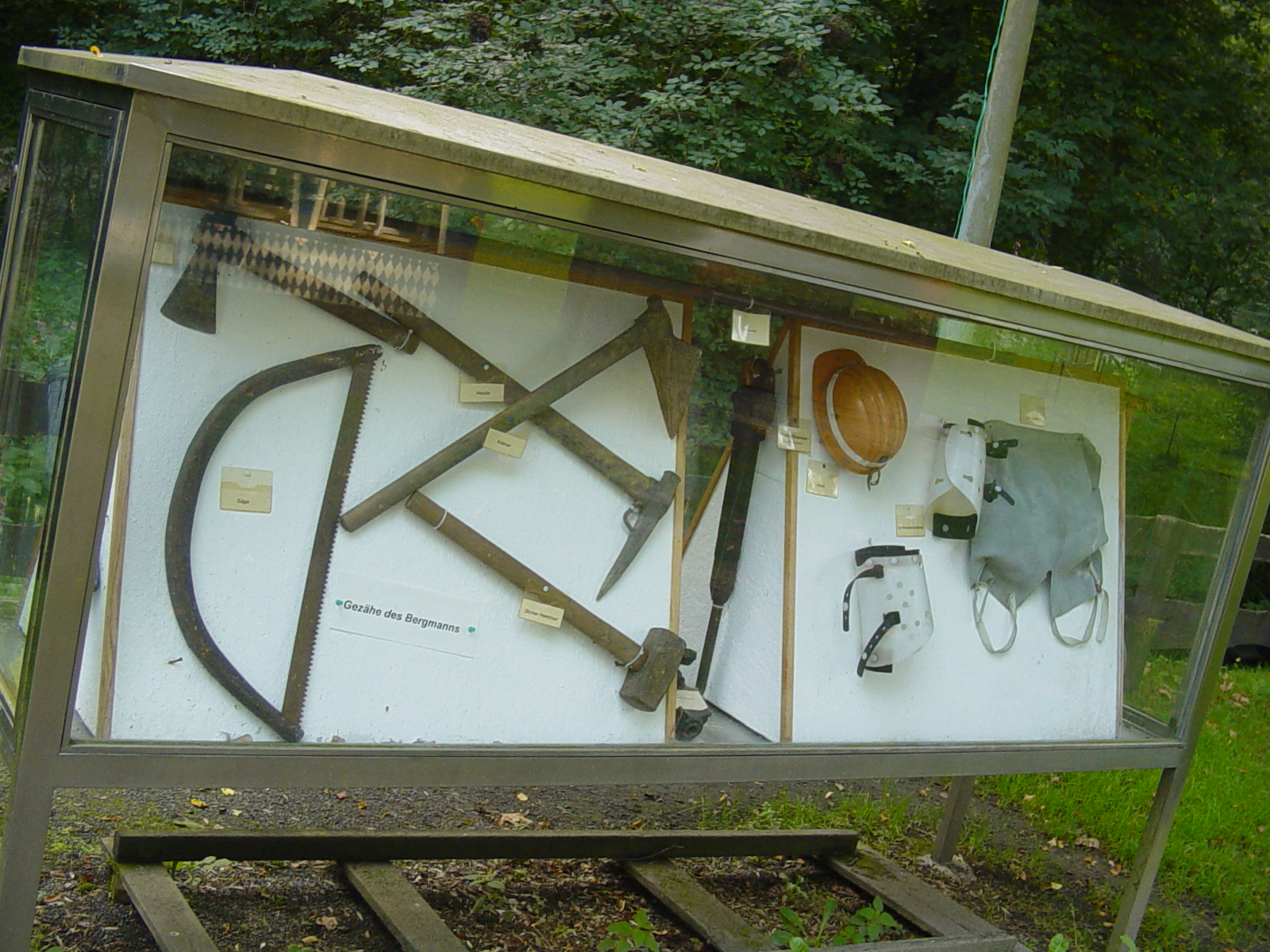
A Gezähe

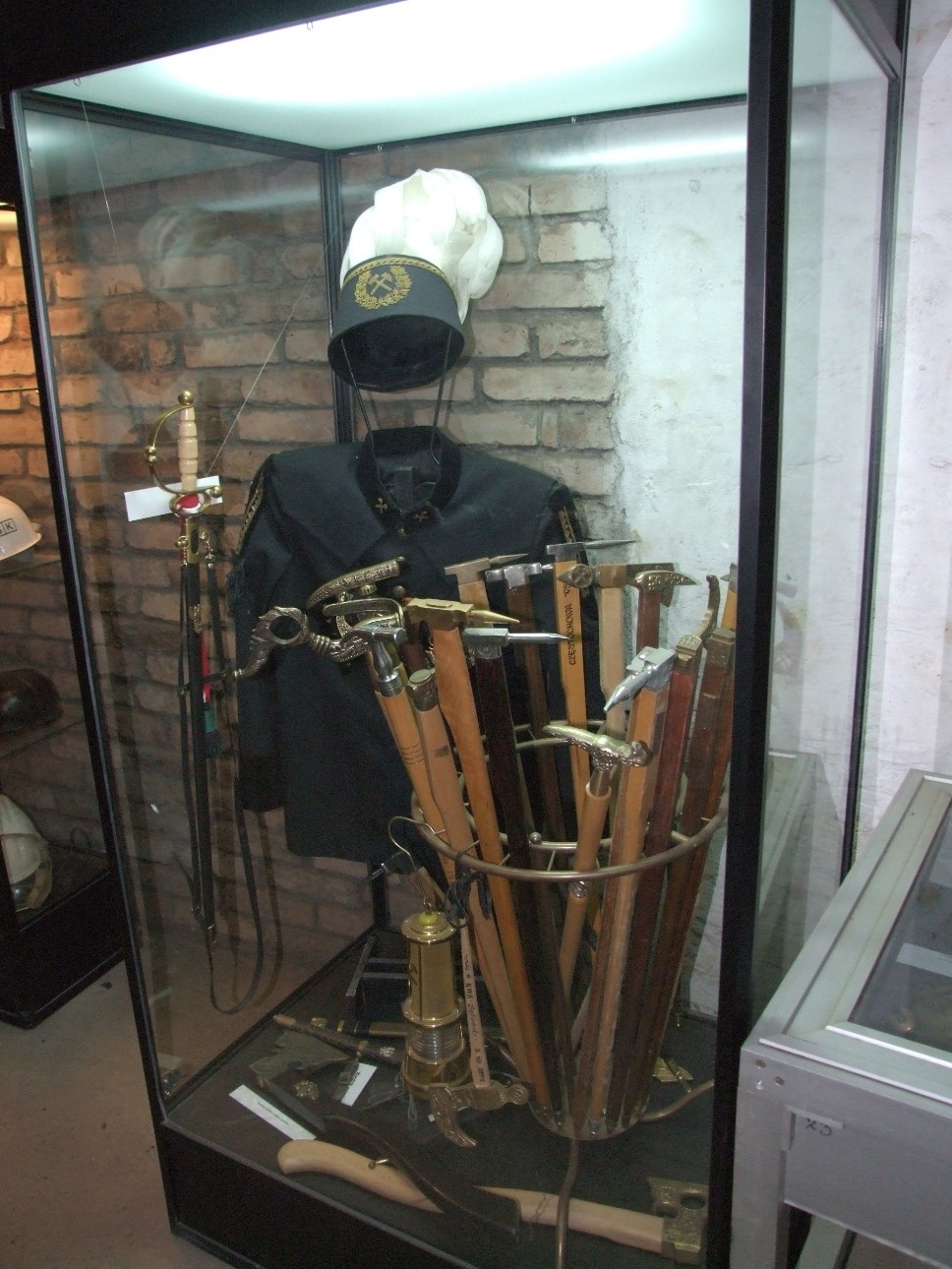
Gezähe (ceremonial version, for miners' parades etc., together with a miner's coat or Bergkittel)

- Abbauhammer or Boxer: a mechanical pick for mining by hand
- Bohrgezähe: blasting or shooting tools and accessories
- Dicker Hammer or Bello (colloquial): a 20 kg sledge hammer
- Grubenbeil: miner's hatchet, a special type of hatchet with a hammer head at the blunt end
  - Kaukamm: a hatchet sharpened on one-side
- Gezähekiste: lockable tool chest
- Gezähering: lockable ring made of a circular iron ring
- Keilhaue: a pick (tool) with a single point
  - Flügeleisen: a pick with two points, mainly used in historical coal mining to create the undercut and to extract coal
  - Breithaue: mattock adze or hoe with a wide blade for soft rock like clay or brown coal
- Kratze and Trog: paddle and basket or tub. The coal or ore material was shovelled into the basket using the paddle and then transported to the loading point
- Säge: historically a mechanical saw, in modern times a compressed air or electric chain saw used to cut wood for shoring
- Schlägel und Eisen: miner's hammer and chisel, also the symbol of mining hammer and pick
- Seifengabel: a type of fork, used open-cast tin mining, similar to a pitchfork. A washer (Seifner) diverted streams in order to wash out the granules of tin ore present in surface layers, a process called streaming or hushing. The fork was used to throw clumps of earth into the sluice or channel used. The names of the German towns of Seiffen (= "streaming") and Graupen (= "granules") were derived from this activity.
- Schlackengabel or Firke: a slag fork, part of a smelter's tool set

=== Gallery ===
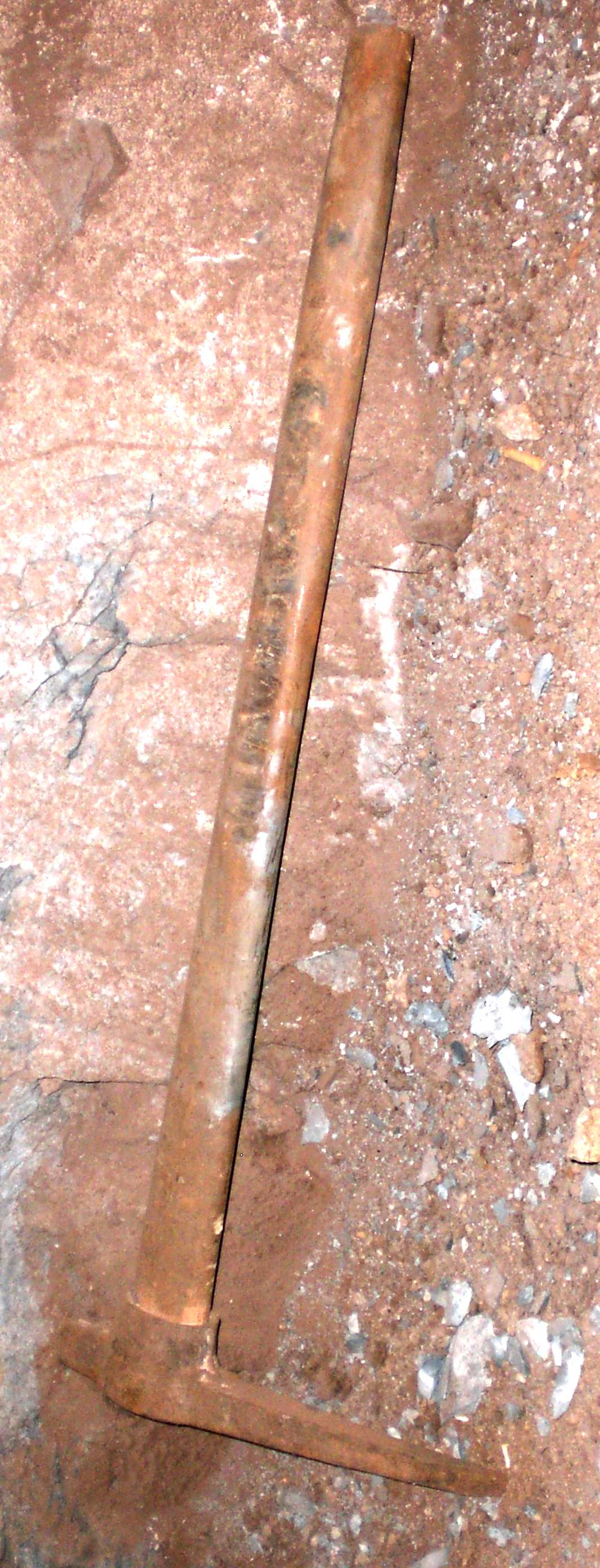
A modern pick

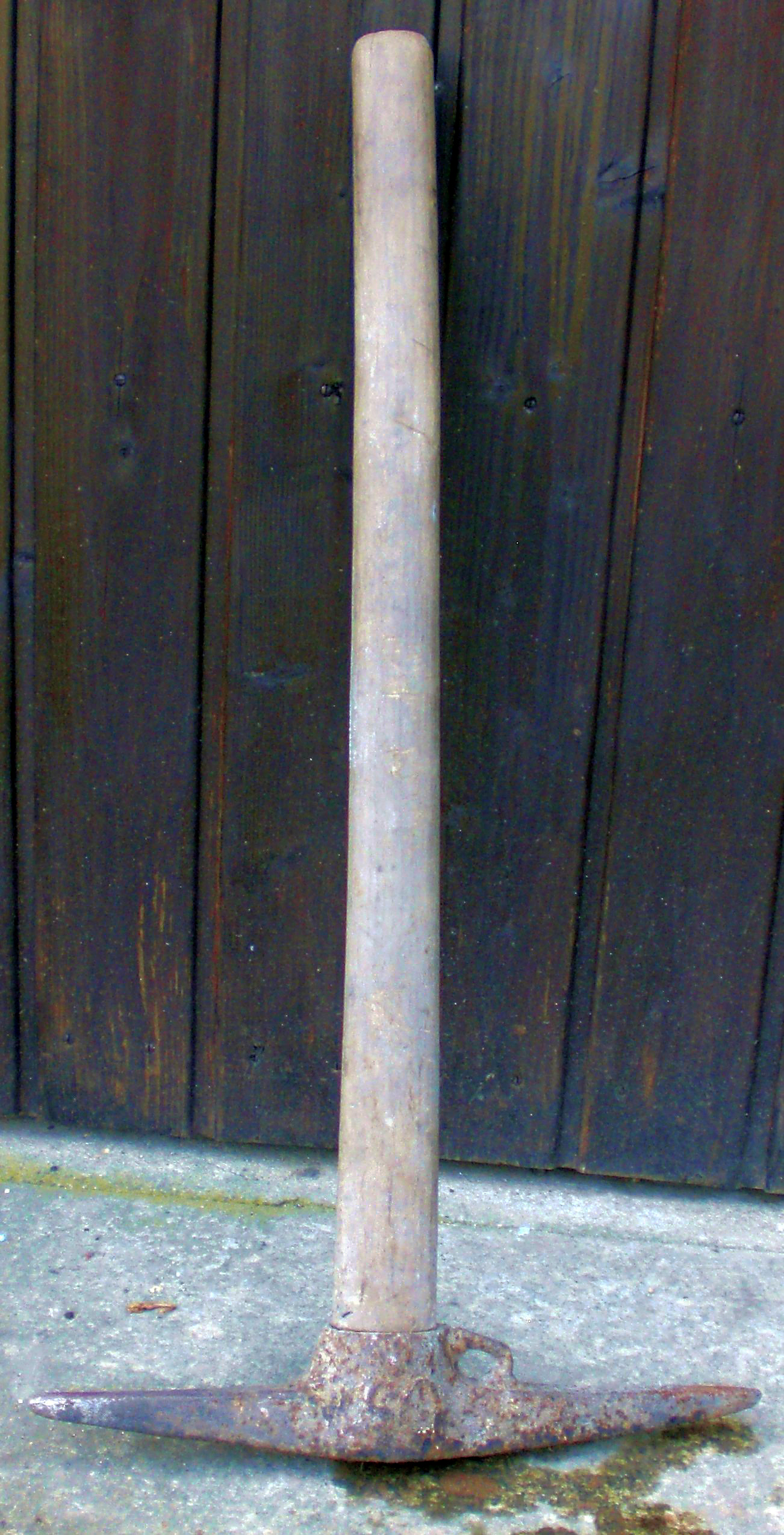
A pick with welded number and eye for the tool ring

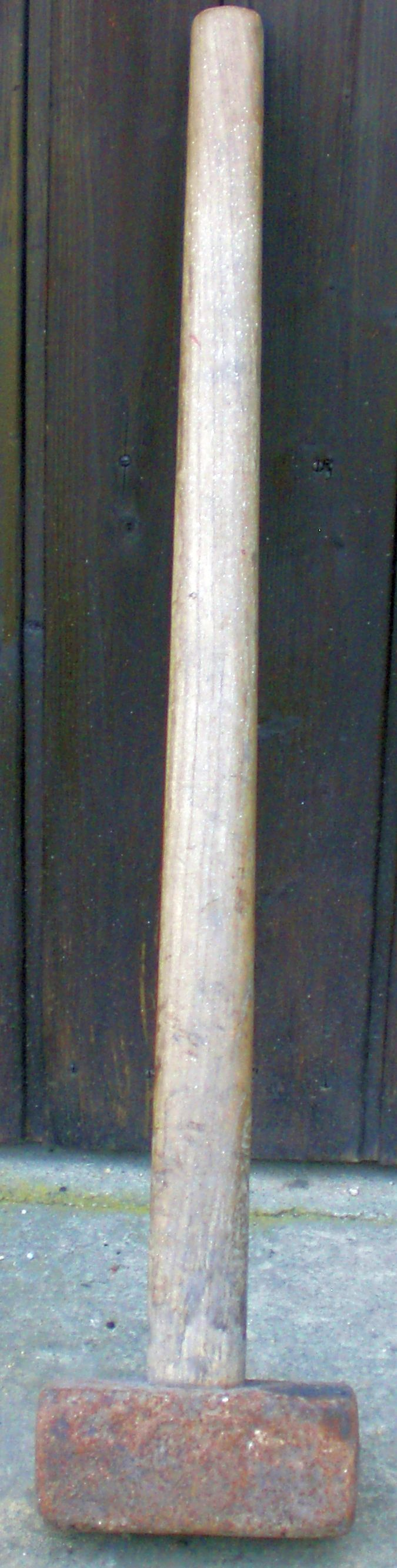
Sledgehammer with welded number

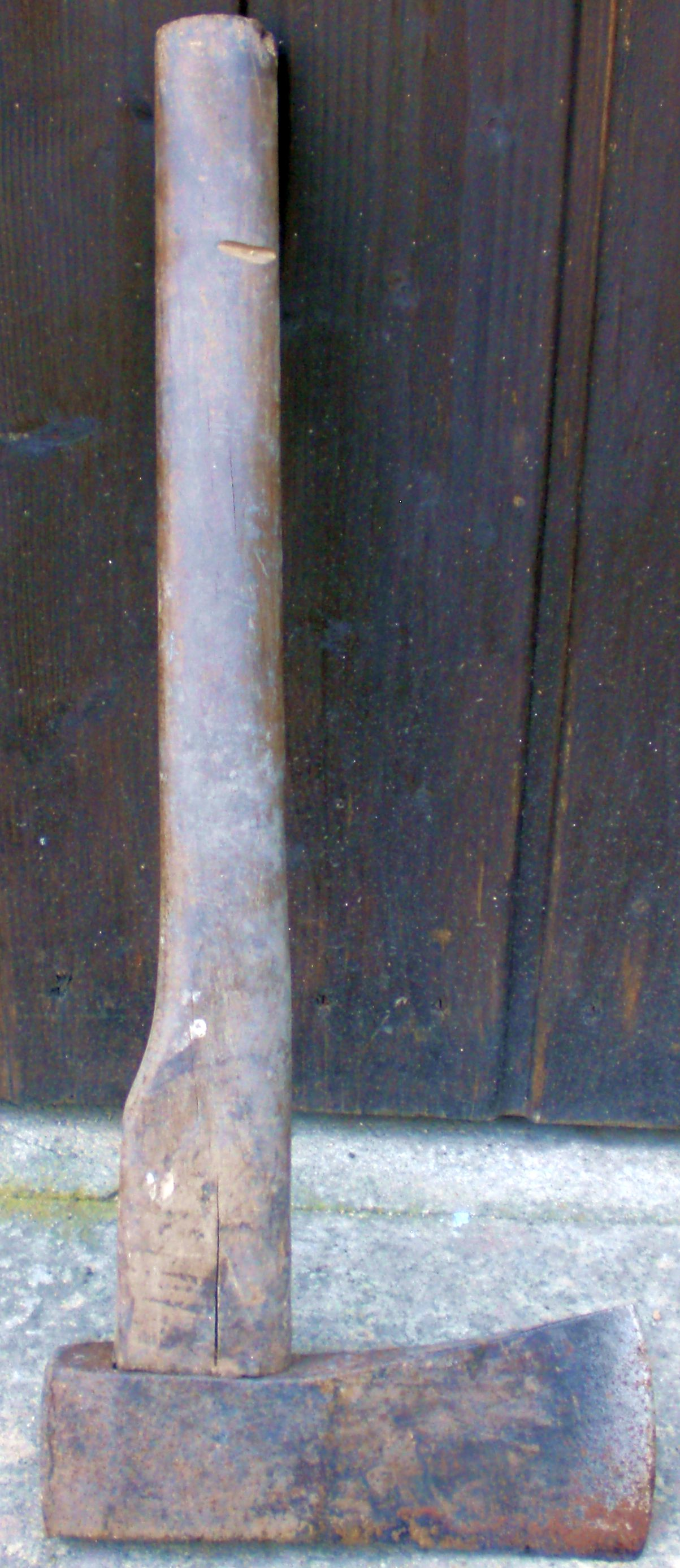
An atypical Kaukamm, the eye and the nail claw are missing, the original number was ground off

== See also ==
- Miner's habit
- Safety lamp

== Literature ==
- Walter Bischoff, Heinz Bramann: Das kleine Bergbaulexikon. Zusammengestellt am Studiengang Bergtechnik der Fachhochschule Bergbau. 7. neu bearbeitete und erweiterte Auflage. Verlag Glückauf GmbH, Essen 1988, ISBN 3-7739-0501-7.
- Konrad Wiedemann: Deutsches bergmännisches Gezähe von 1500 bis 1850. Aus dem Mittelalter in die Neuzeit. Ein Bericht. In: Lapis. 34, 6, 2009, ISSN 0176-1285, pp. 19–24.
