= Bergleder =

Bergleder is a German term, literally meaning "mine leather", and may refer to:

- miner's apron, an item of miner's clothing
- one of the minerals actinolite or tremolite
