= Miner =

Person working within a mine

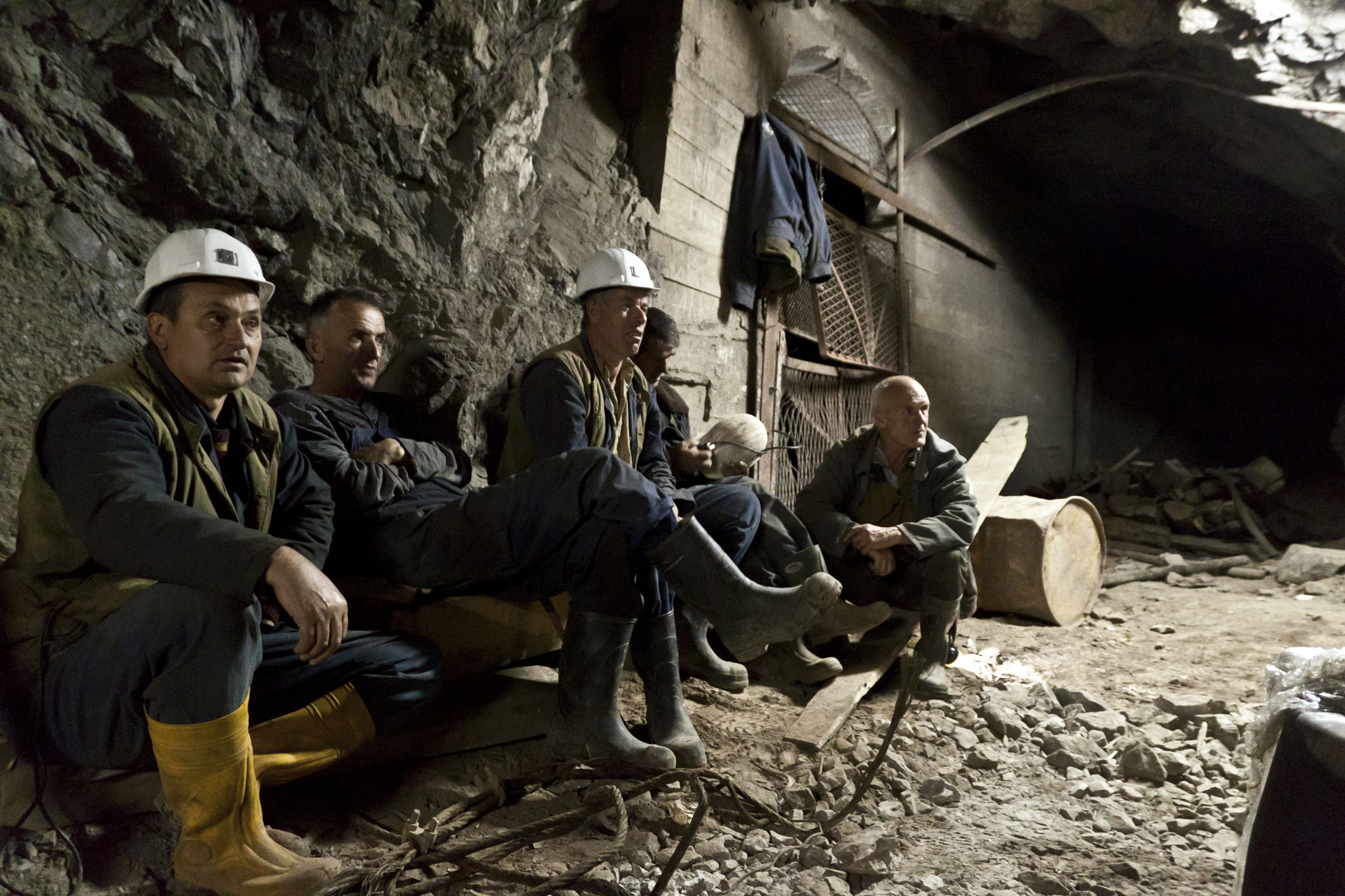
- Miners at the Trepča Mines in Mitrovica, Kosovo in 2011

Occupation
- Occupation type: Manual labor
- Activity sectors: Mining

Description
- Fields of employment: Mining
- Related jobs: Prospector, mining engineer

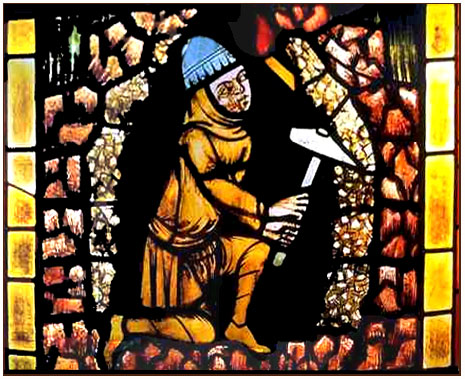
Freiburg Miner wearing a Mooskappe, stained glass window, 1330

A miner is a person who extracts ore, coal, chalk, clay, or other minerals from the earth through mining. There are two senses in which the term is used. In its narrowest sense, a miner is someone who works at the rock face; cutting, blasting, or otherwise working and removing the rock. In a broader sense, a "miner" is anyone working within a mine, not just a worker at the rock face.

Cave-ins, explosions, toxic air, and extreme temperatures are some of the most dangerous mining accidents. The overall long-term health effects of underground mining conditions is also a hazard. In some countries, miners lack social guarantees and in case of injury may be left to cope without assistance.

In regions with a long mining tradition, many communities have developed cultural traditions and aspects specific to the various regions, in the forms of particular equipment, symbolism, music, and the like.

== Roles ==
Different functions of the individual miner. Many of the roles are specific to a type of mining, such as coal mining. Roles considered to be "miners" in the narrower sense have included:

- Hewer (also known as "cake" or "pickman"), whose job was to hew the rock.
  - Collier, a hewer who hews coal with a pick.
- Driller, who works a rock drill to bore holes for placing dynamite or other explosives.

Other roles within mines that did not involve breaking rock (and thus fit the broader definition) have included:

- Loader (also called a "bandsman"), who loads the mining carts with coal at the arm.
- Putter (also known as a "drags-man"), who works the carts around the mine.
- Barrow-man, who transported the broken coal from the face in wheelbarrows.
- Hurrier, who transported coal carts from a mine to the surface.
- Timbers, who fashions and installs timber supports to support the walls and ceiling in an underground mine.

In addition to miners working in the seam, a mine employs other workers in duties in the sea. In addition to the office staff of various sorts, these may include:

- Brakesman, who operate the winding engine.
- Breaker boy who removes impurities from coal.
- Emergency Structure Engineer, who makes sure that cave-ins are dealt with when called

== Modern miners ==
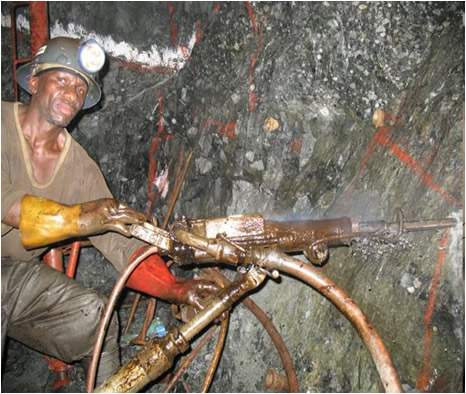
A miner at work

Mining engineers use the principles of math and science to develop philosophical solutions to technical problems for miners. In most cases, a bachelor's degree in engineering, mining engineering or geological engineering is required. Because technology is constantly changing, miners and mining engineers need to continue their education.

The basics of mining engineering includes finding, extracting, and preparing minerals, metals and coal. These mined products are used for electric power generation and manufacturing industries. Mining engineers also supervise the construction of underground mine operations and create ways to transport the extracted minerals to processing plants.

== Gallery ==
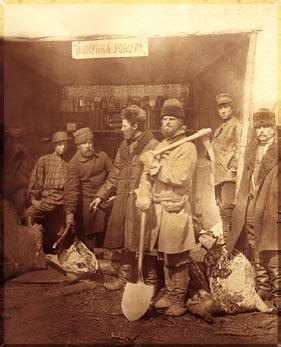
Zheltuga miners c. 1883-1886

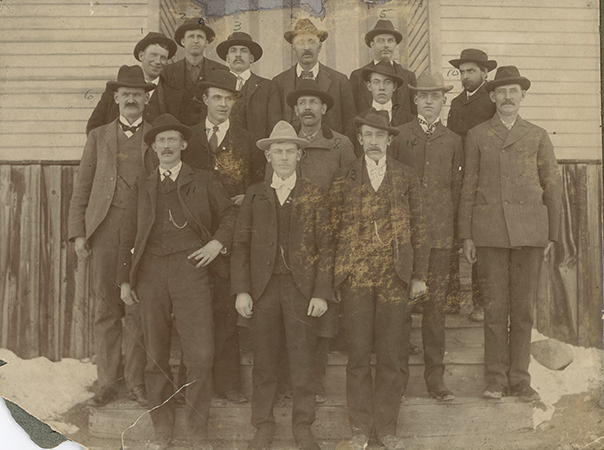
London Mine members posing for a group photograph in Park County, Colorado, 1896

Two miners at work in Alaska, 1916

Miners in northern Sakhalin in front of a mine shaft c. 1924

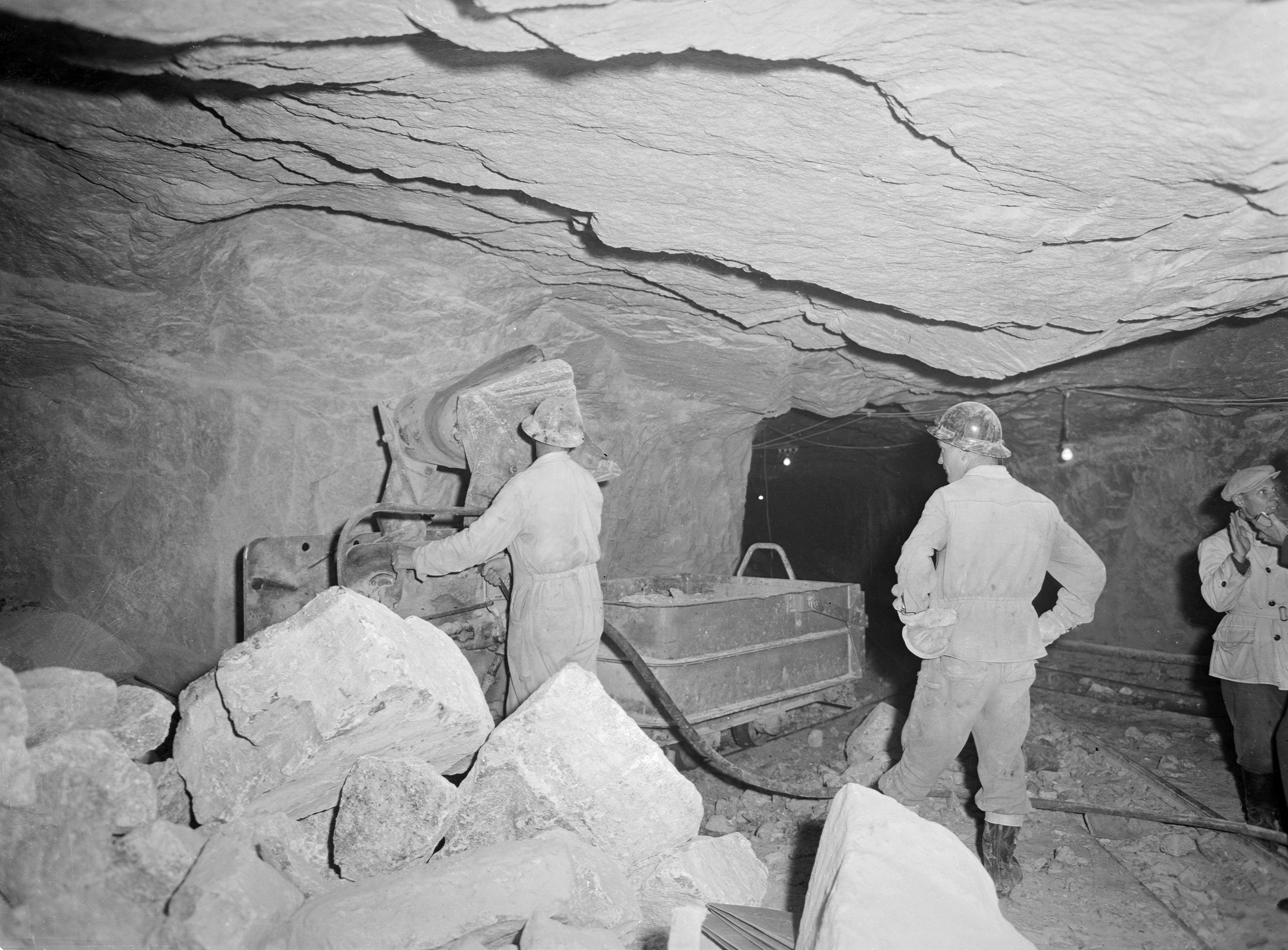
A group of miners at the limestone mine in Sipoo, Finland, 1950

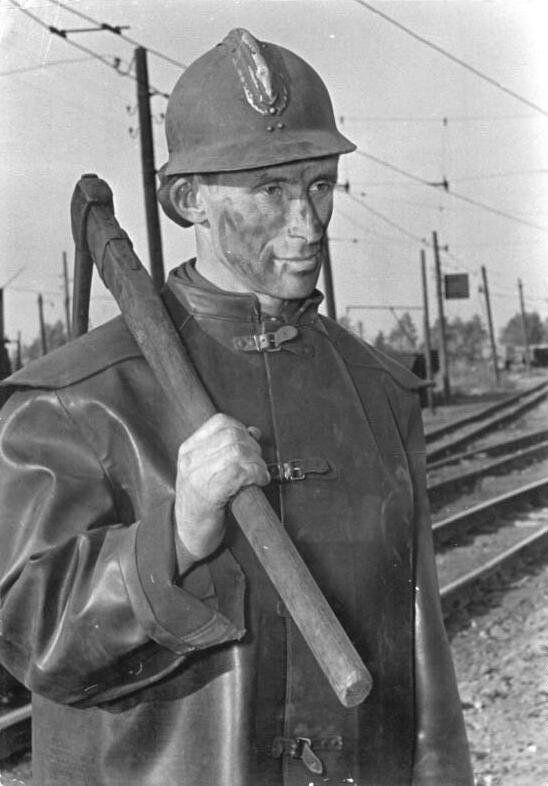
A brown coal miner with a pickaxe. West Germany, 1952

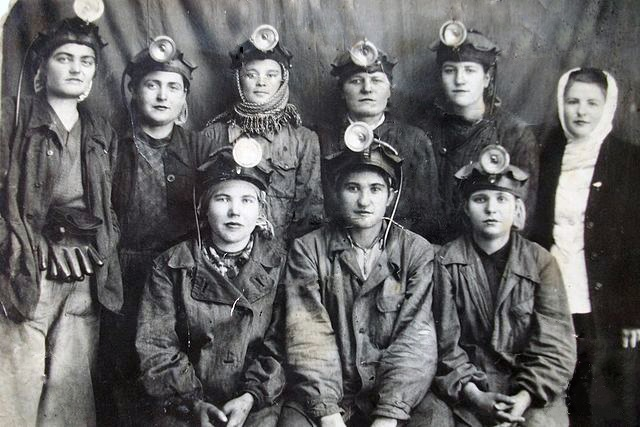
Women miners in Kok-Yangak, Kirghiz SSR, 1957

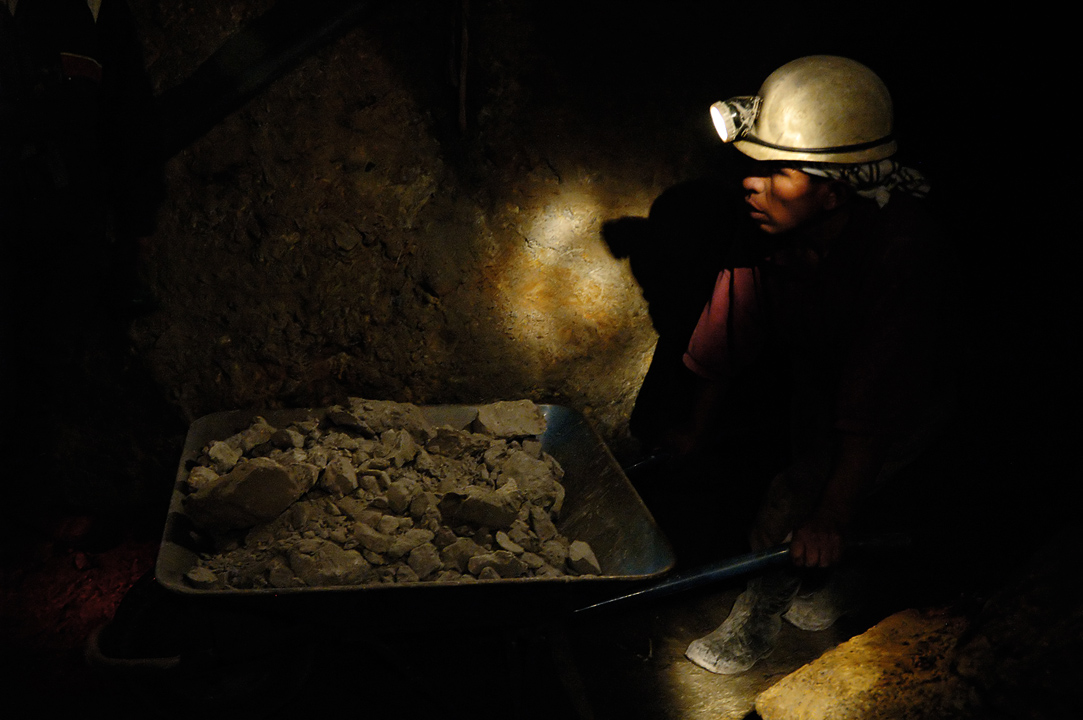
Miner in a mine of the "Cerro Rico" at Potosí, Bolivia, 2006

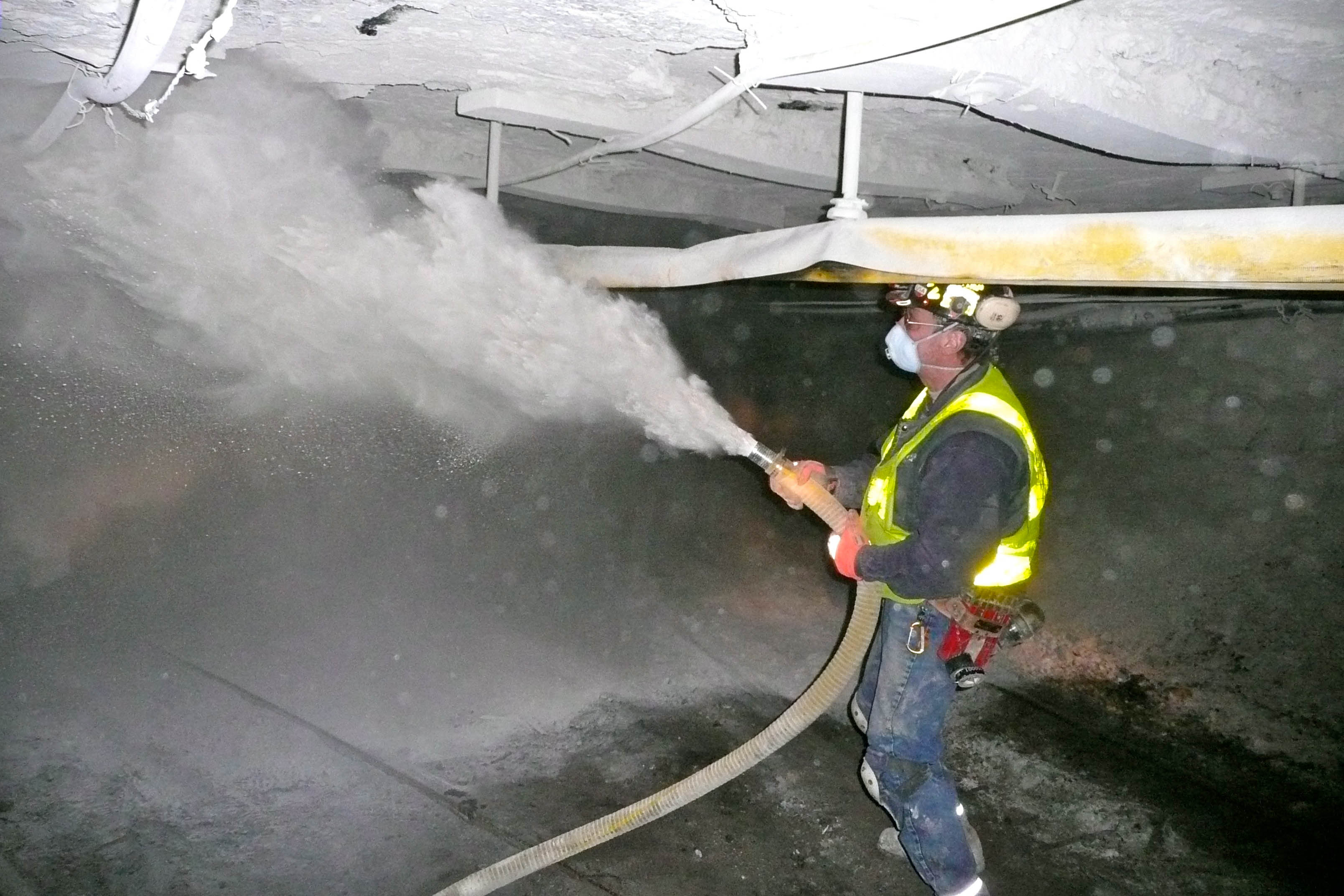
Miner spraying rockdust in a mine in West Virginia, 2009

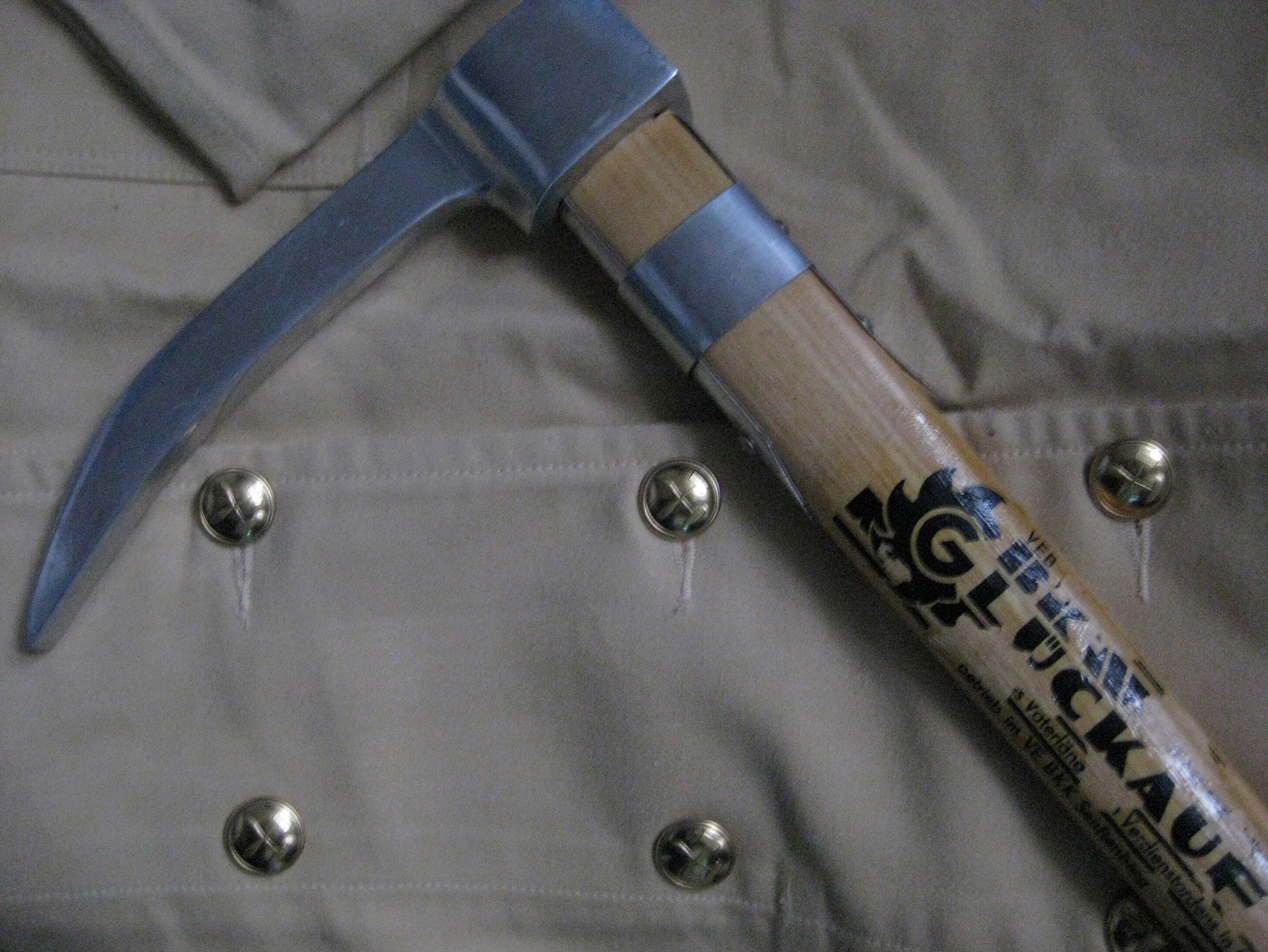
Ceremony hammer of a miner VEB Kombinat Senftenberg (GDR) - with honorary uniform

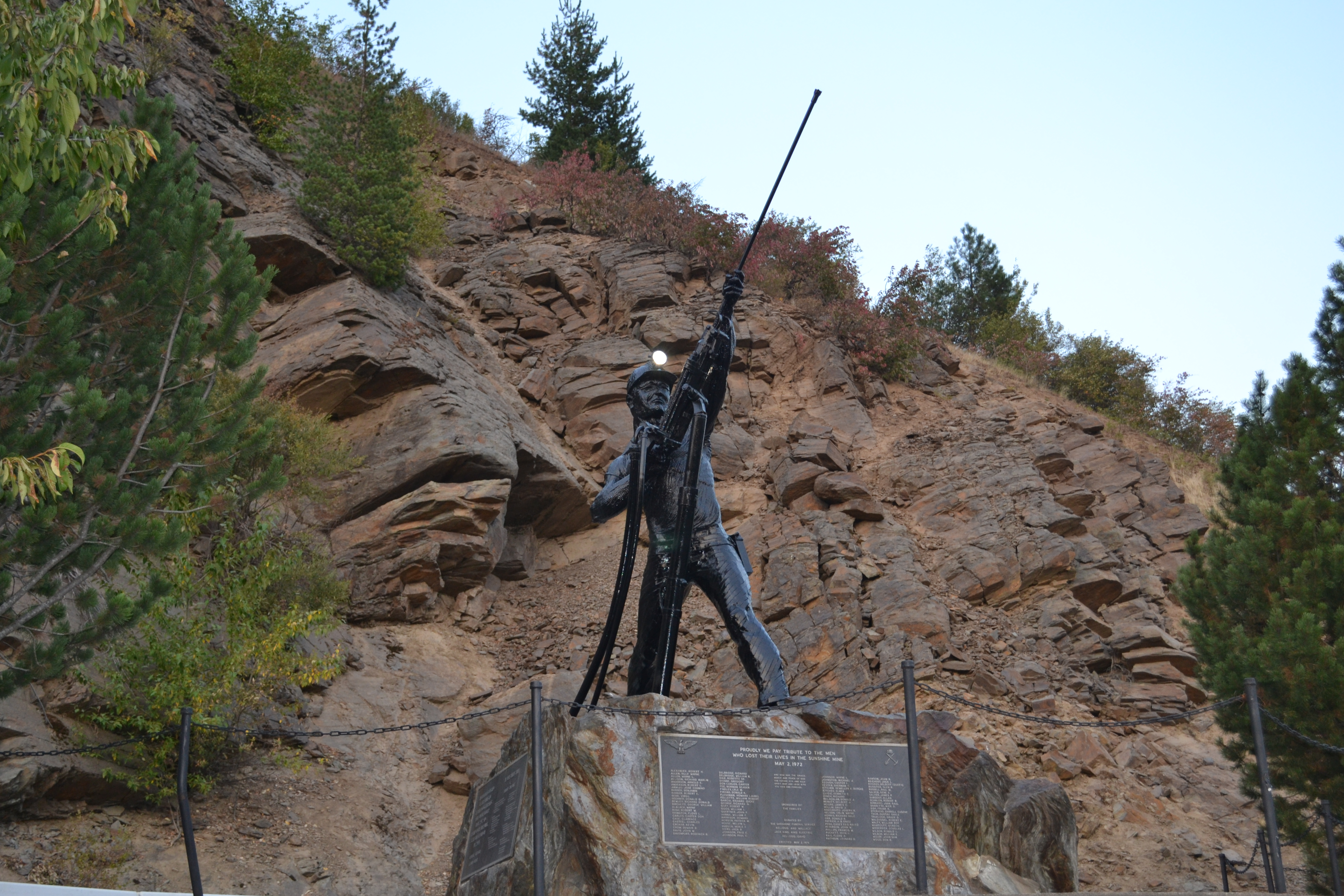
Sunshine Miners Memorial in Silver Valley, Idaho

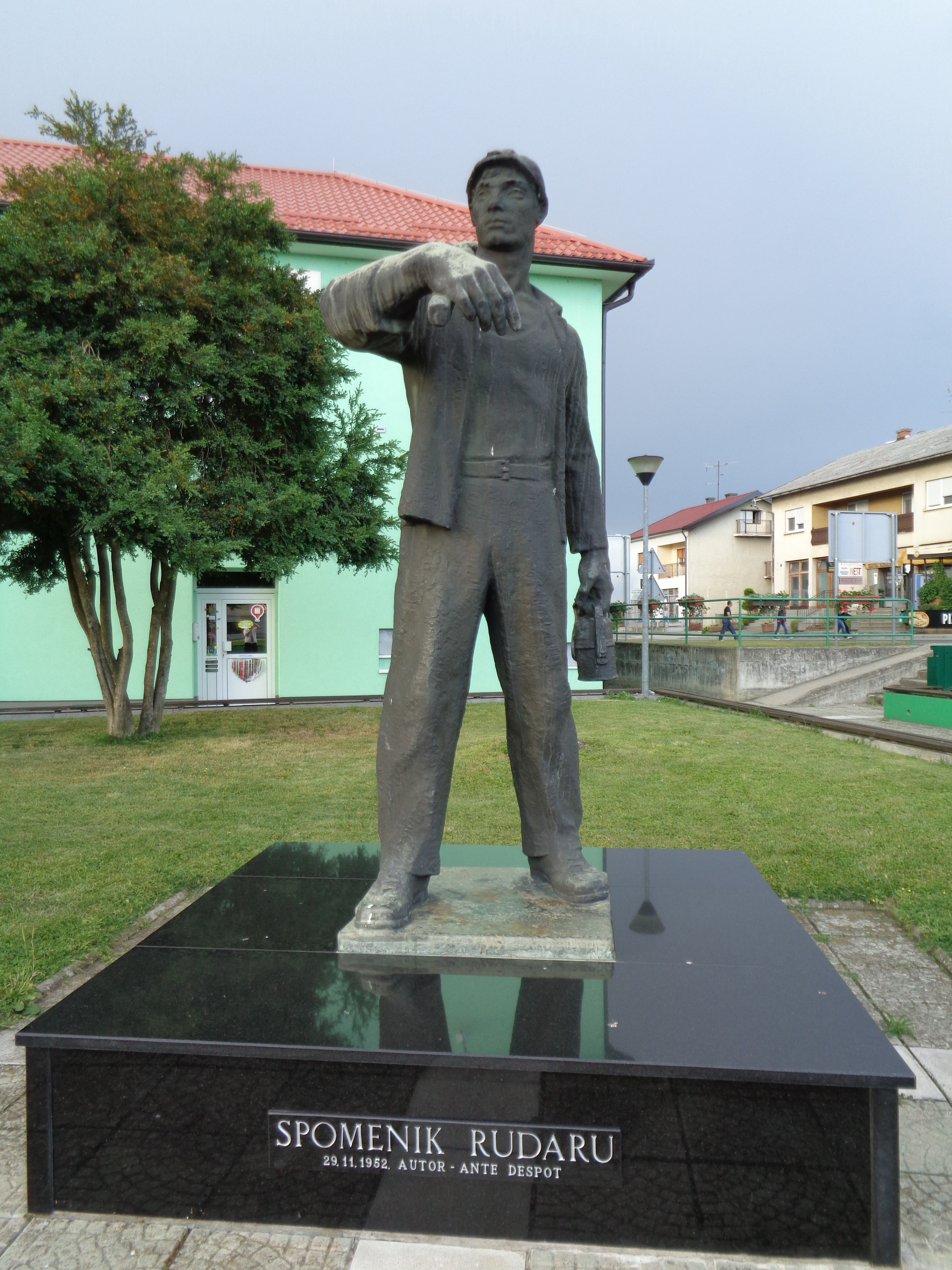
Coal Miner's Memorial in Mursko Središće, Croatia

== See also ==
- Amateur geology
- Mineral collecting
- Miner's apron
- Miner's cap
- Miner's habit
- Mining helmet
- Prospecting
- Salt mining
- Underground mining (hard rock)
