= Miner's axe =

German miner's ceremonial axe

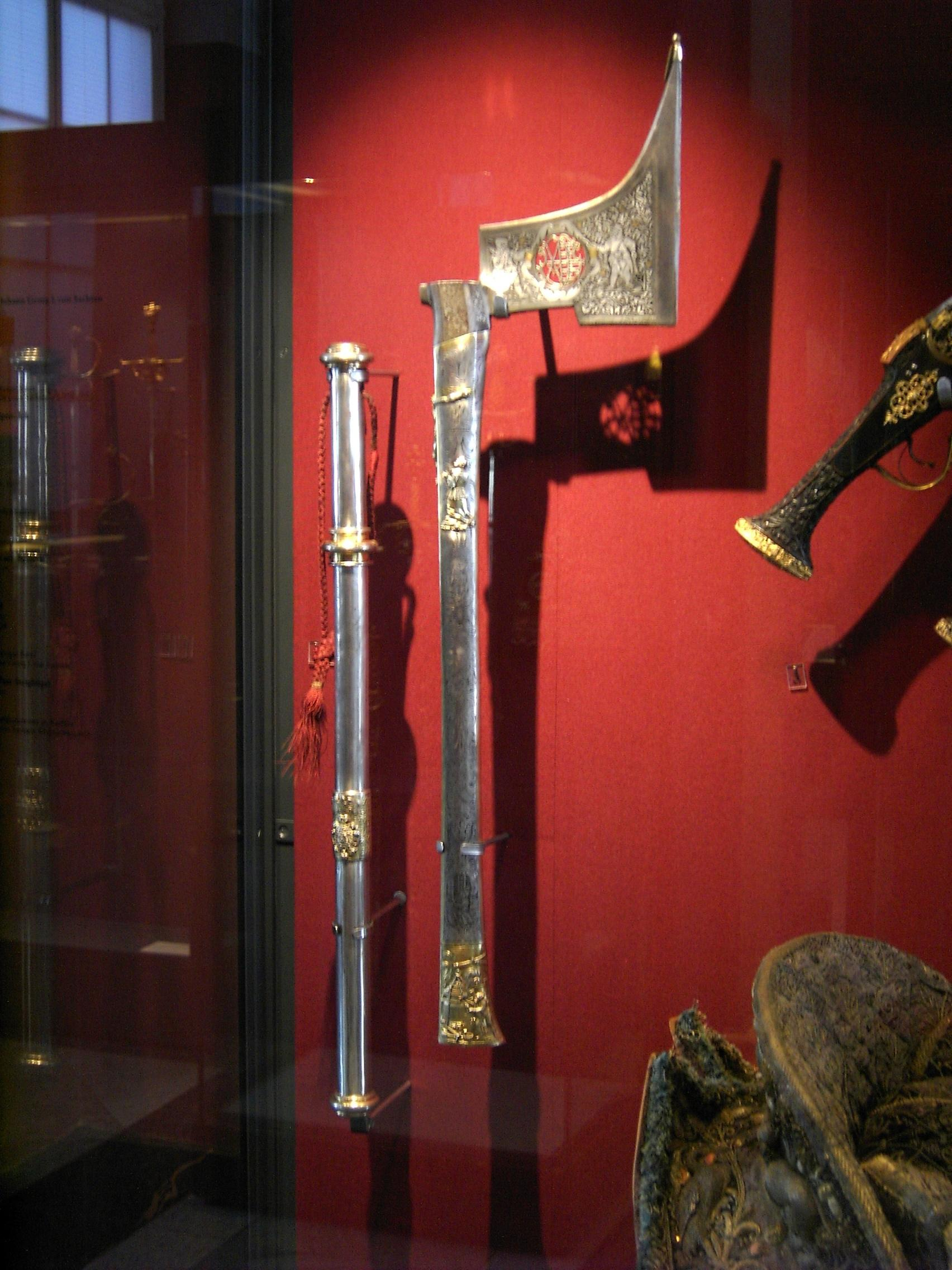
A Bergbarte

The miner's axe (German: Bergbarte, Bergparte) is a ceremonial axe serving as a part of the German miner's habit donned for miners' parades.

It is a small axe with the long top tapering to a point and a long handle.

It is also called colloquially "Barte" or "Parte", which is a medieval term for axe in general. The word is preserved, e.g., in Hellebarde, "halberd".

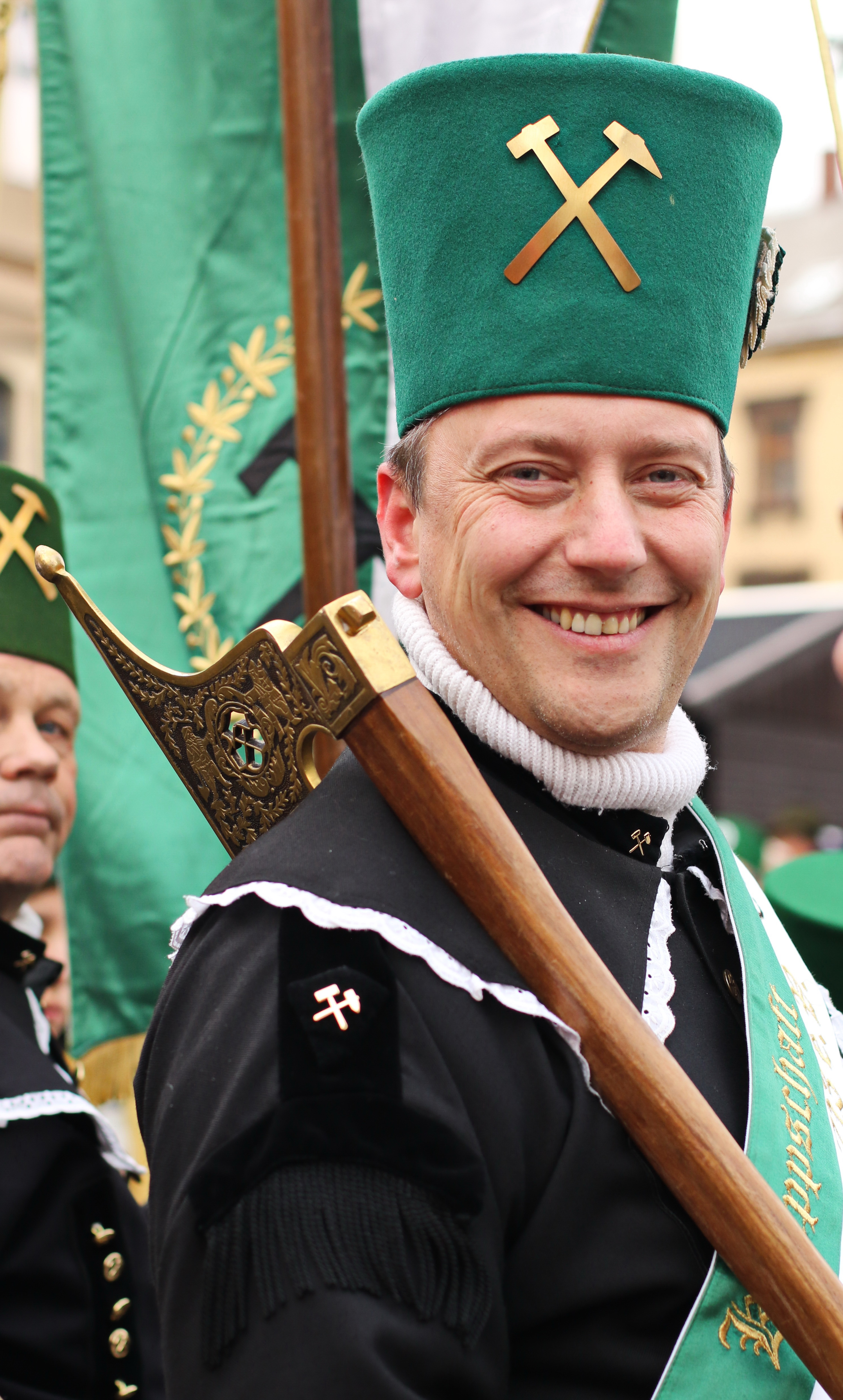

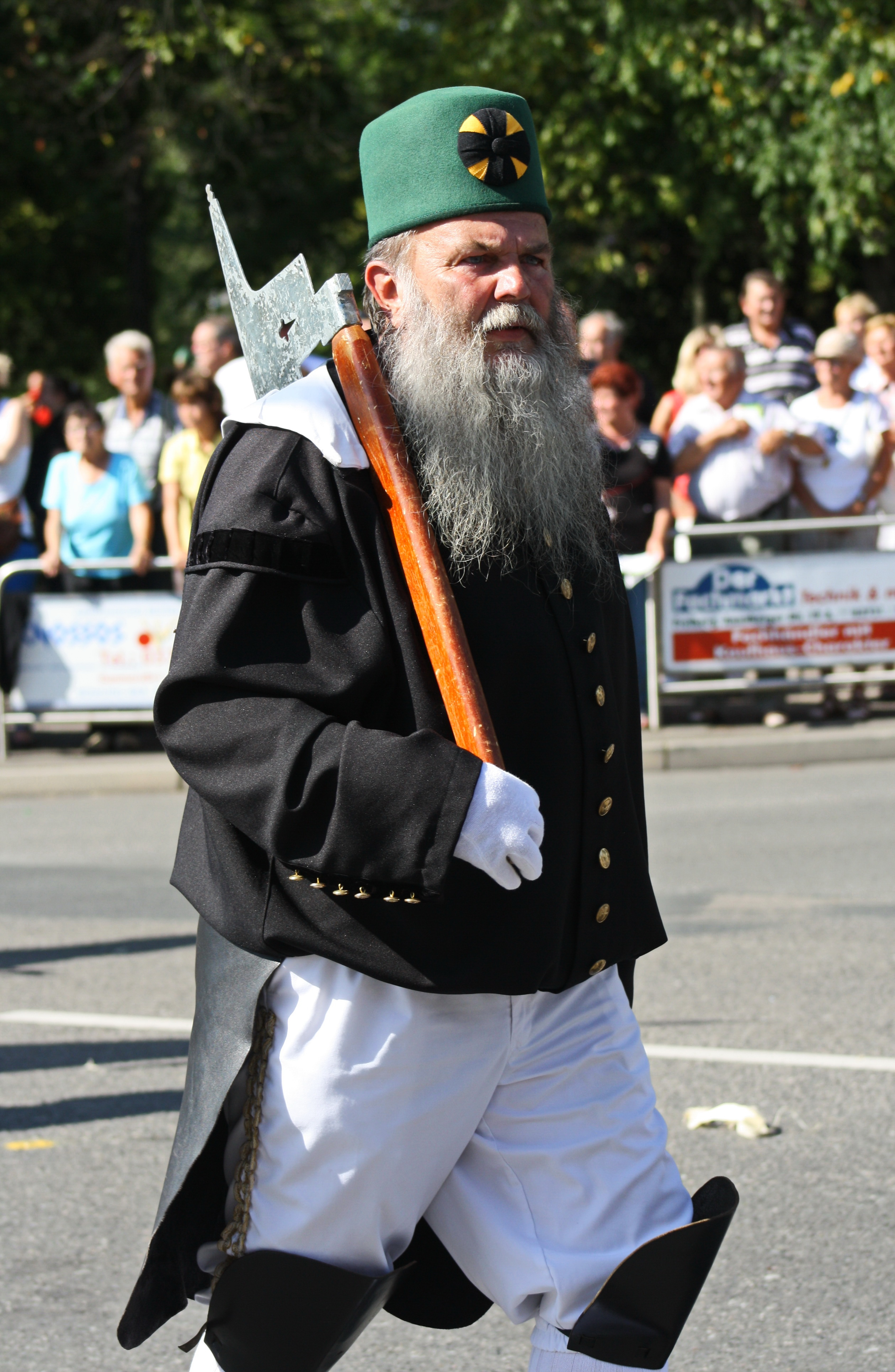

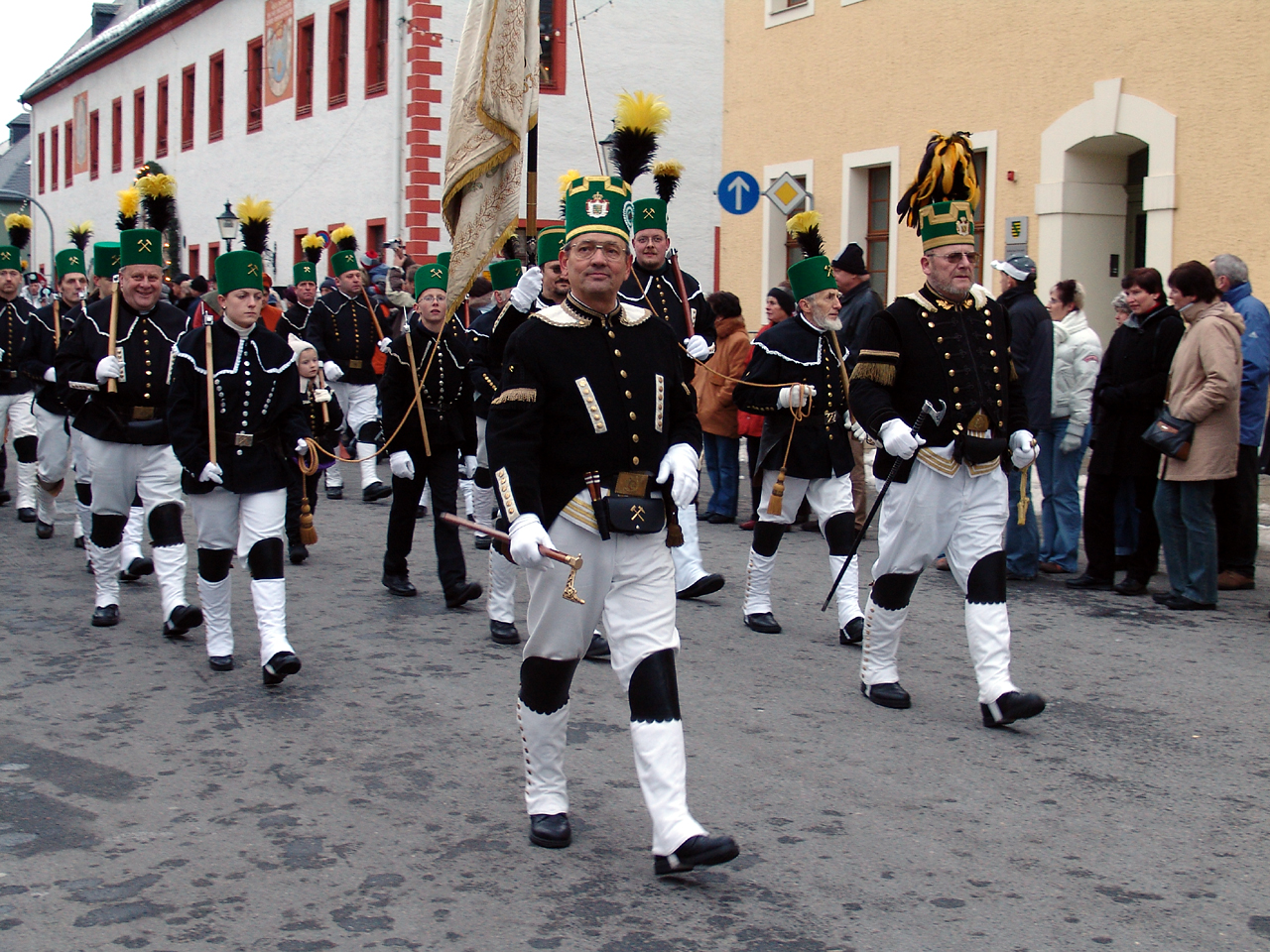
Miner's parade

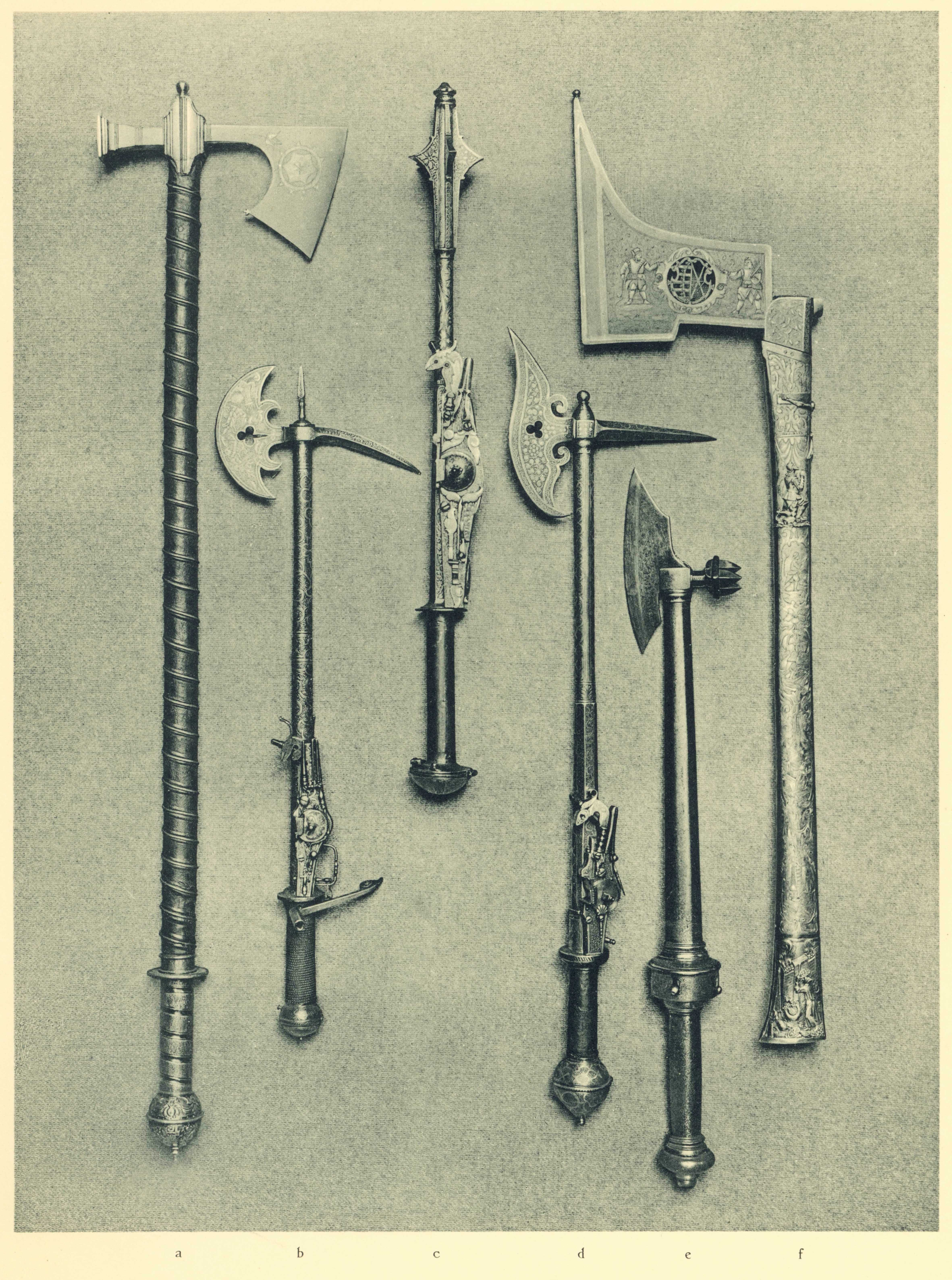
Various axes

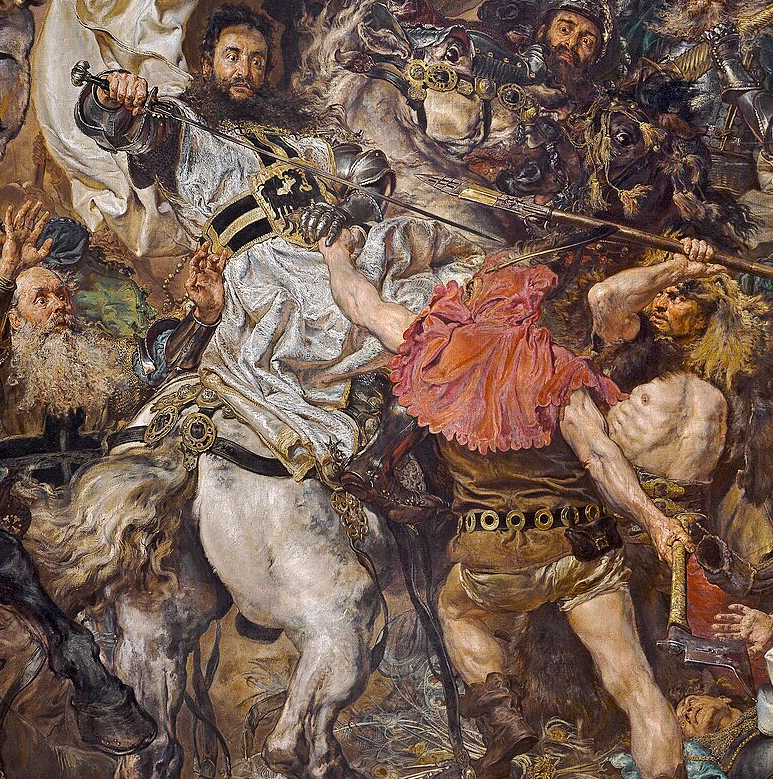
Ulrich von Jungingen assaulted with a miner's axe
