= Hammer and Chisel =

Hammer and Chisel or variants may refer to:

- Hammer and chisel (tools), a common term for the literal joint usage of these hand tools
- Hammer & Chisel, Inc., the original name of Discord, Inc.
- Hammer and chisel, an uncommon alternate name for the Hammer and pick, German heraldic symbol of mining
