= Miner's habit =

Traditional dress of miners guilds in Europe

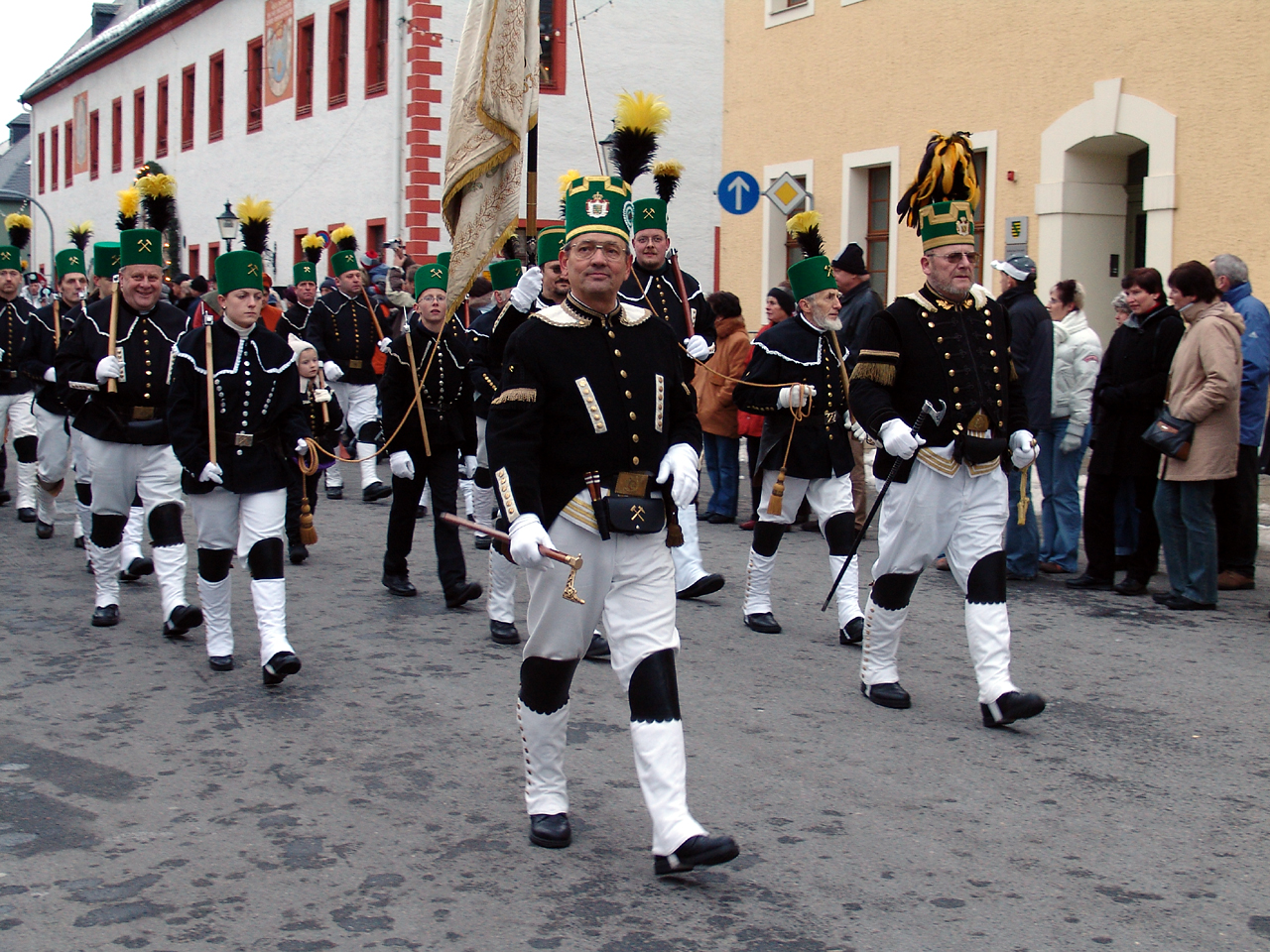
Miners in their parade uniform (miners' parade in Marienberg, Saxony, 2005)

A miner's habit (German: Berghabit or Bergmannshabit) is the traditional dress of miners in Europe. The actual form varies depending on the region, the actual mining function, and whether it is used for work or for ceremonial occasions.

== Elements ==
At work, the miner of the Middle Ages in Europe wore the normal costume for his local region – pit trousers (Grubenhose), shoes and miner's jacket (Bergkittel).

Only gradually was the typical miner's uniform created by the addition of unmistakable elements of miner's apparel such as the miner's apron (Arschleder), knee pads (Kniebügel), miner's cap (Fahrhaube or Fahrkappe, later pit hat (Schachthut), the mining tools needed for work in the pit, such as hammers (Fäustel), chisels (Eisen), wedges, picks (Keilhauen), hoes (Kratze), shovels, crowbars, pikes (Brechstangen) or miner's chisels (Bergeisen), mallets (Schlägel) or carpenter's hatchets, the miners' safety lamps (often a Froschlampe), and the Tzscherper bag (for the miner's knife (Tzscherpermesser) and lamp accessories like rape oil, flint and tinder).

There were specific accoutrements for the individual trade groups. The mining foreman or Steiger, for example, carried the Steigerhäckel, a simple hewer (Häuer) bore a miner's hatchet (Grubenbeil). Able miners (Doppelhäuer) carried a miner's axe (Bergbarte or Bergparte), which was simultaneously a tool and a weapon. The smelters (Hüttenleute) wore the leather apron as a pinafore (Schürze) in front of them (i.e. "back to front") and carried various implements: the Firke or Furkel, the rake (Rechen) and the tapping bar (Stecheisen or Abstichlanze).

In 1769 in Saxony, the Marienberg Bergmeister, von Trebra, introduced the wearing of the black mining habit.

The variety of mining habits may still be seen in the mining processions typical of the old mining regions even today.

== Gallery ==
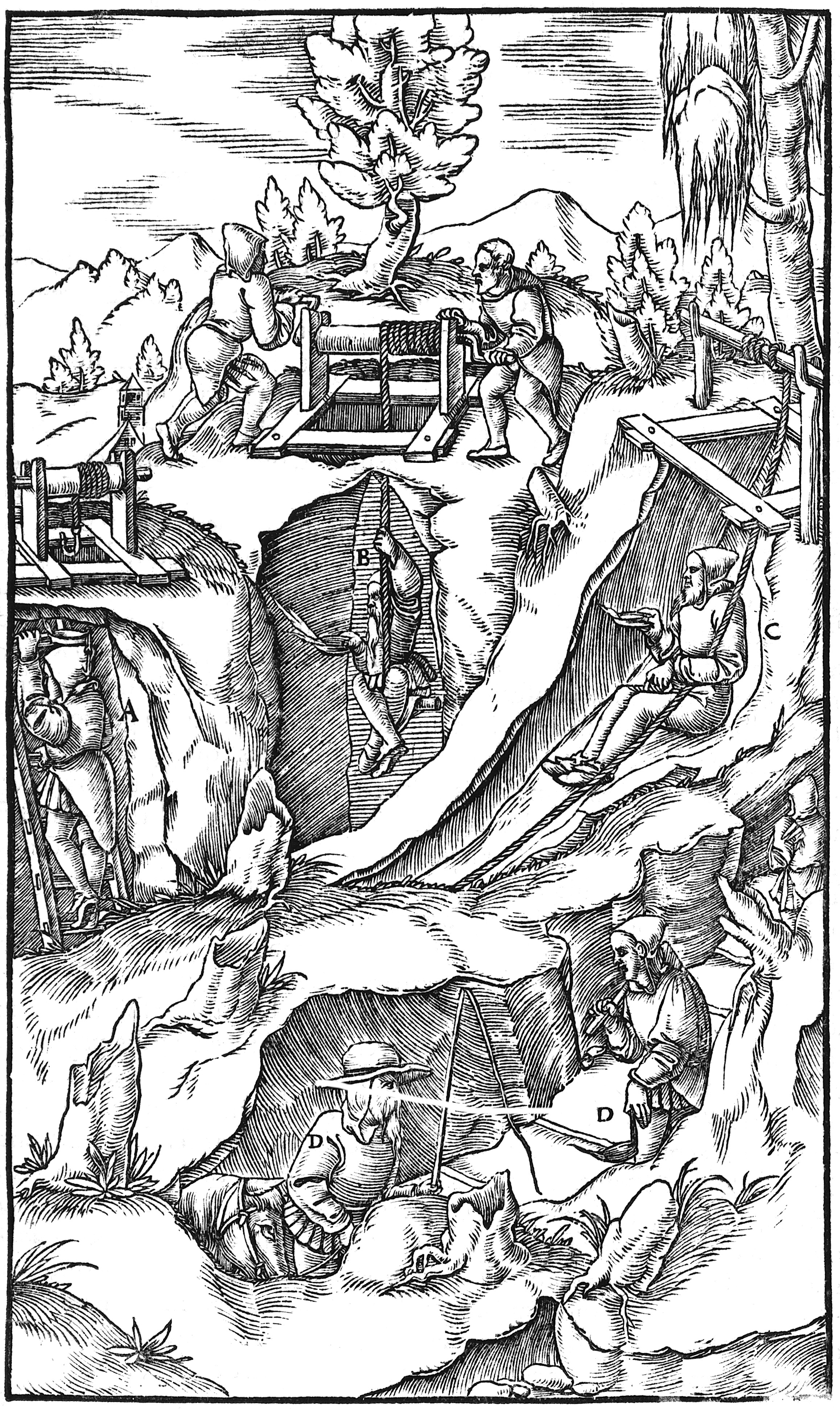
Miners with helmets (Fahrhauben) (illustration by Agricola mid-16th century)

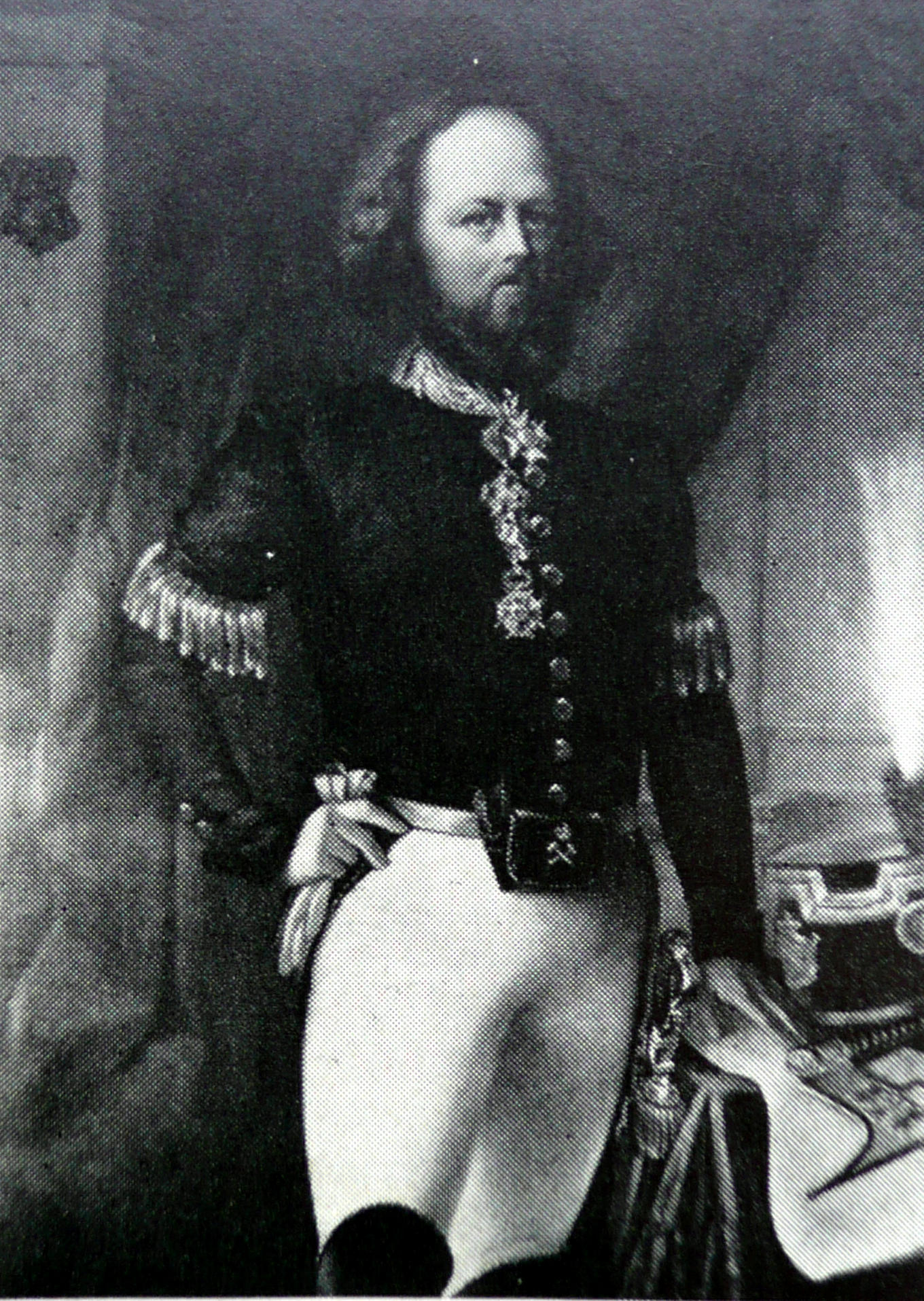
Friedrich Constantin von Beust in the uniform of a Saxon Oberberghaupt-mann

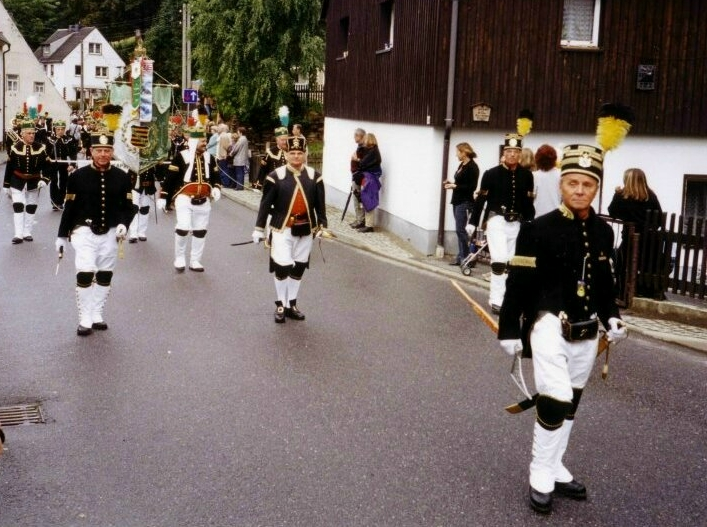
Miners' Association of Pobershau in their parade uniform (2004)

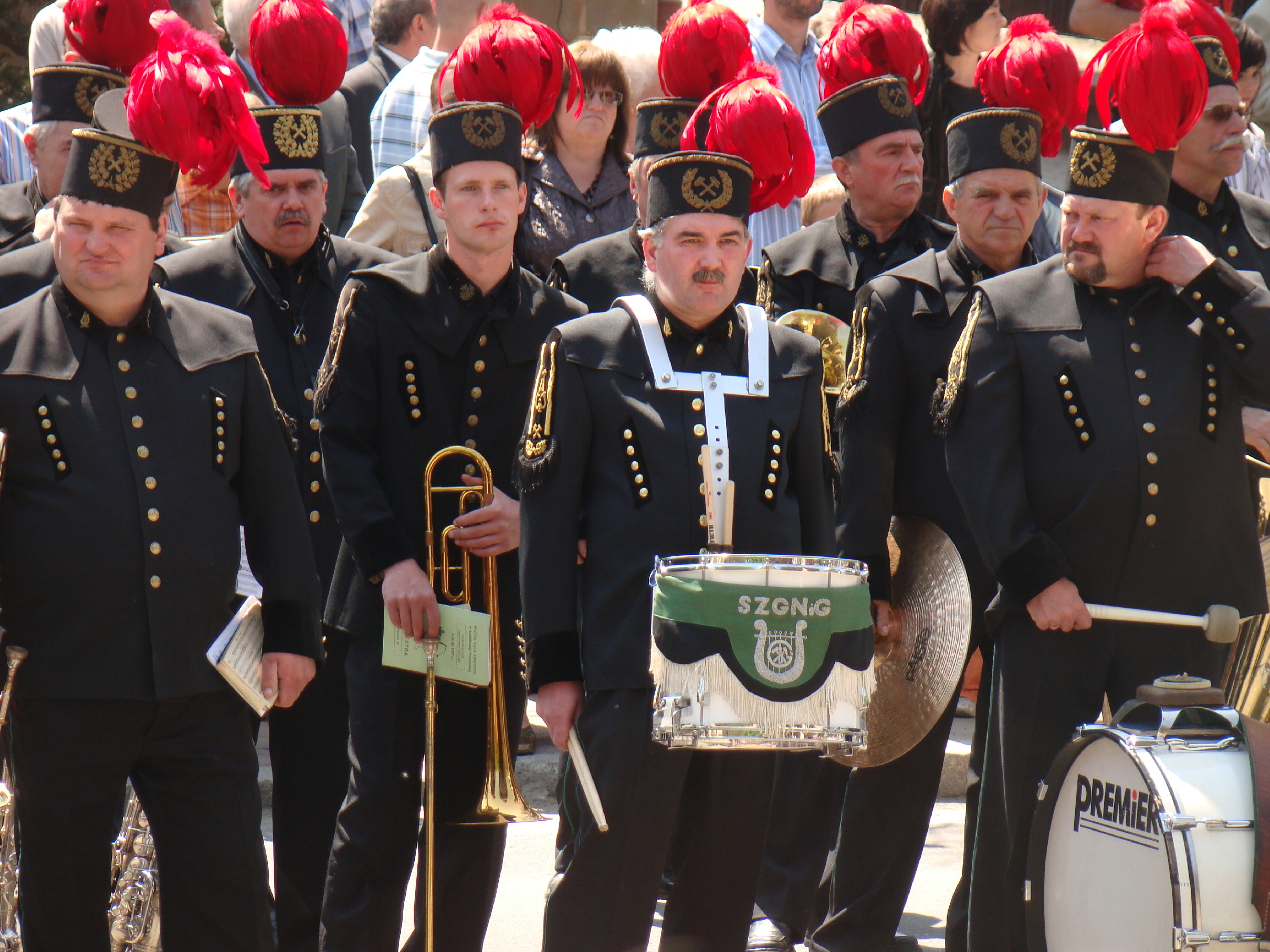
Miners' band in Polish Sanok (2009)

== See also ==
- Miner's apron
- Miner's cap
- Mooskappe – miner's cap from the Harz

== Literature ==
- Rost, G. E. (1831), Trachten der Berg- und Hüttenleute im Königreiche Sachsen: nach dem neuesten Reglement mit landschaftlichen Umgebungen aus den verschiedenen Bergamtsrevieren nach der Natur gezeichnet in Kupfer gestochen und treu colorirt (in German), Freiberg
- Fritzsch, Karl-Ewald; Friedrich Sieber (1957), Bergmännische Trachten des 18.Jahrhunderts im Erzgebirge und im Mansfeldischen (in German), Berlin: Akademie-Verlag, p. 79
