= Mooskappe =

Traditional miner's head covering

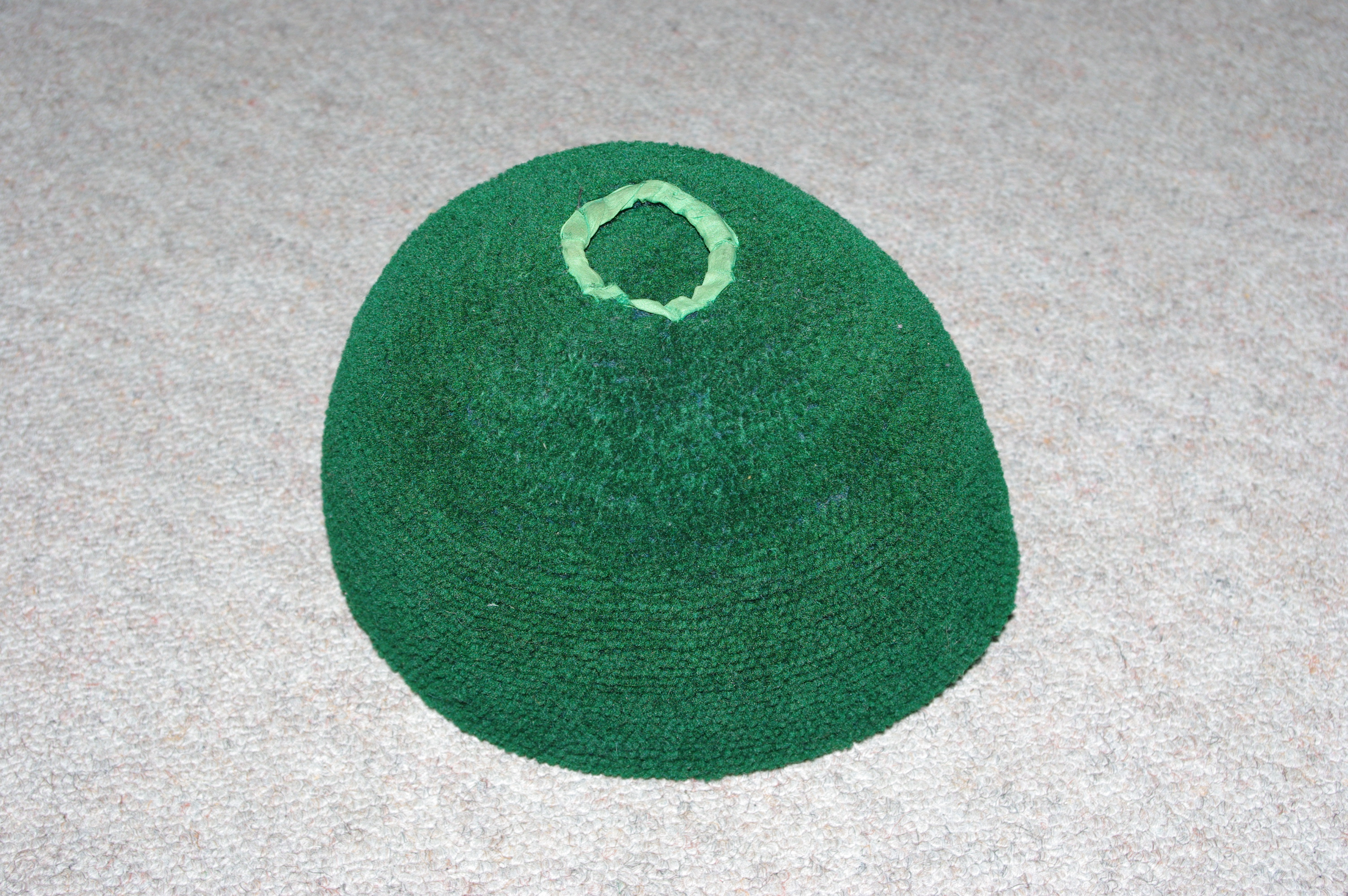
A typical Harz Mountains Mooskappe

The Mooskappe is an old, traditional miners head covering. It was intended to protect miners when working underground from the impact of small rockfalls and from hitting their heads against the gallery roof (Firste). The term is German and this type of hat was worn especially in the Harz Mountains of Germany.

== History ==
It is known that the Mooskappe was definitely used in the Harz and Barsinghausen mining regions. It appears in steel engravings from about 1850, for example by Wilhelm Ripe, as an important item of safety gear. In 1824 Heinrich Heine visited the Caroline and Dorothea mines at Clausthal, writing about these visits in various works. About the miner's uniforms he says:

These [miners] wore dark, wide, usually steel blue, jackets, usually hanging below their bellies, trousers of similar hue, a hide apron tied behind them and a small, green, felt hat, entirely rimless, like a truncated ball.
(Diese (Bergleute) tragen dunkle, gewöhnlich stahlblaue, weite, bis über den Bauch herabhängende Jacken, Hosen von ähnlicher Farbe, ein hinten aufgebundenes Schurzfell und kleine grüne Filzhüte, ganz randlos wie ein abgekappter Kegel.)

— Heinrich Heine, Die Harzreise (1824)

== Design ==
The Mooskappe was usually made of a hard, green felt, but there were also "crocheted" (gehäkelte) designs. The shape is either clearly cylindrical but it can also be dome-shaped.

== See also ==
- Miner's cap
- Miner's habit
