= Hammer and pick =

Mining symbol

Hammer and Pick

The hammer and pick, rarely referred to as hammer and chisel, is a symbol of mining, often used in heraldry. It can indicate mining, mines (especially on maps or in cartography), or miners, and is also borne as a charge in the coats of arms of mining towns.

The symbol represents the traditional tools of the miner, a hammer and a chisel on a handle, similar to a pickaxe, but with one blunt end. They are pictured in the way a right-handed worker would lay them down: the pick with the point to the right and the handle to the lower left, the hammer with the handle to the lower right and the head to the upper left. The handle of the pick protrudes over the head, because the head is not permanently fixed, but can be swapped for a newly sharpened head when it is blunt from use. In coats of arms the symbol is often shown in black (Johanngeorgenstadt, Hövels), but also in natural colours (Telnice) or in gold or silver (Abertamy, Bodenwöhr, Gelsenkirchen).

== Examples ==
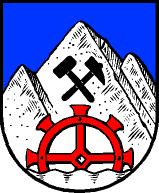
Arms of Mühlbach am Hochkönig, Salzburgerland, Austria

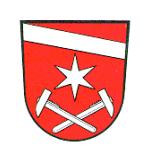
Arms of Töpen, Bavaria, Germany

Coat of arms of New Zealand

Coat of arms of Świętochłowice, Poland

Flag of Karlovy Vary Region, Czech

Arms of Kerkrade, Kerkrade, Limburg, The Netherlands

Former United States Geological Survey logo

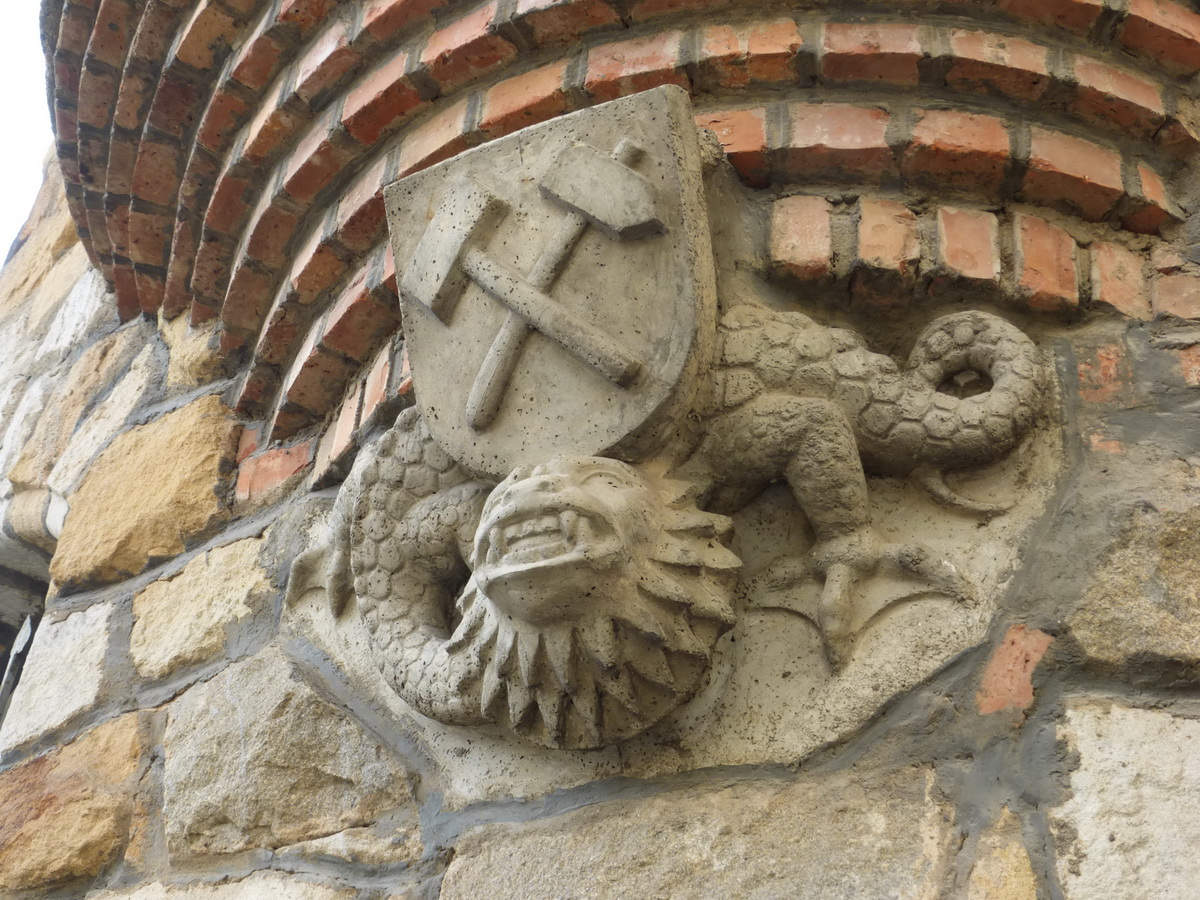
Hammer and pick on the former administration building of the Bavarian Lignite Industry AG in Wackersdorf, Germany

Seal of the State of Colorado in the United States.

== Other ==
The hammer and pick is used to indicate the working day, on timetables. As an emoji, it is often used as a symbol by fans of Premier League side West Ham United, Ukrainian Premier League club Shakhtar Donetsk, Eerste Divisie football club Roda JC Kerkrade and Ekstraklasa club Górnik Zabrze.

=== Unicode ===
In Unicode, the "hammer and pick" symbol is U+2692 ⚒.

== See also ==
- Arm and hammer
- Hammer and sickle
