= Miners' parade =

Annual parade celebrating mining heritage

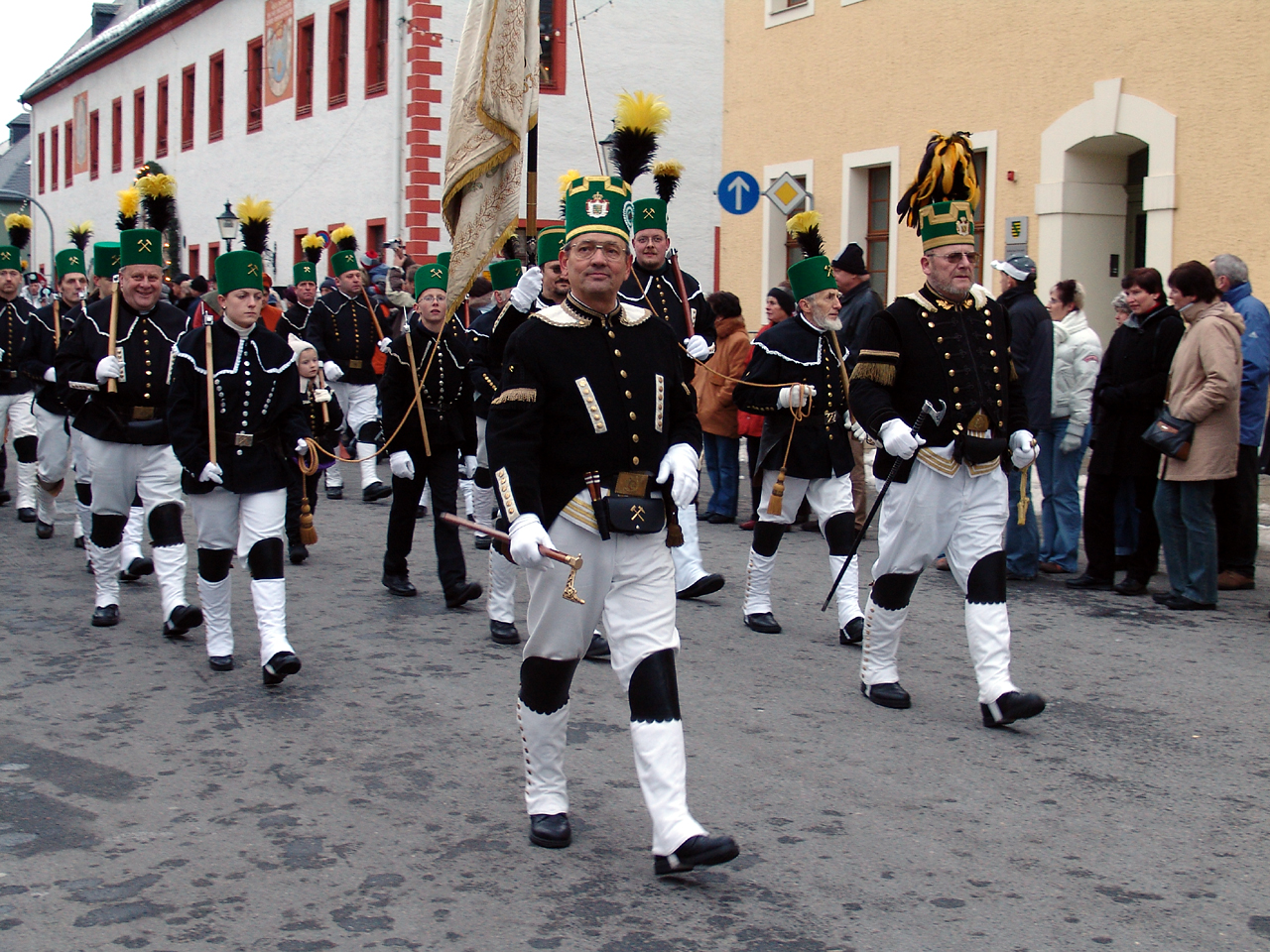
Miners' parade in Marienberg in the Ore Mountains on the 3rd Advent Sunday in 2005 (with the Bergknapp- und Brüderschaft "Glück Auf" society from Frohnau).

The Miners' Parade is a parade traditionally held in places in Austria and Germany where ore was and is smelted. It was and is a public event held by a community or corporation whose employment is linked to mining and smelting. It is usually known in German as a Bergparade (lit. "Mine Parade"), but also as a Berg- und Hüttenparade (lit. "Mine and Smeltworks Parade"). It takes place as one of the highlights of a festival (but can also be held as a protest march to fight for the redress of abuses). The Miner's Parade is a special form of procession which is organised to march past important dignitaries or which is organized for such high-ranking individuals.

== History ==
This tradition originated in the Saxon Ore Mountains. It has been performed out in various ways over the centuries. The original miners' and smelters' traditional costumes (Tracht) were superseded by a miner's habit (Berghabit) which frequently changed. After 1768, with the introduction of ranks, district colours and other regulations, the dress of Saxon miners and smelters metallurgy developed a uniform-like character and was actually called a uniform from that time. The format, sequence and occasion for the parades, as well as the number of participants, were and are variable, with between 100 and 3,000 participants being recruited from the mining or smelting works or both.

The format was never standard. The number of participating overseers (Steiger) and officiants (Offiziante), hewers (Hauer) or smelters (Schmelzer) (and, in Freiberg, officials of the Mining Office and student miners) depended on the importance of the parade. The size of the detachments varied between 16 and 48 men, and they almost always marched in 4 ranks (rarely 3, 6 or 8). The number of flags carried, the number and type of mining and smelting tools carried on parade and the officers participating on horseback was variable. The size of the parade also affected the number of miners' bands involved.

Miners' parades have been depicted in art, with paintings, carvings, and cast works portray the subject.

== Present day ==
Today miners' parades take places on various occasions, such as Christmas markets, folk festivals, and street festivals as well as other celebrations, in the following towns and cities:

- Austria
  - Styria
    - Leoben, Bergparade Montanuniversität Leoben
  - Salzburg
    - Bad Ischl, e. g. European "Knappen- und Hüttentag" in 2024
- Germany
  - Saxony
    - Aue, on the 1st Advent
    - Annaberg-Buchholz, on the 4th Advent, the largest miners' parade in Germany
    - Brand-Erbisdorf, on the 2nd Advent
    - Chemnitz, on the Sunday before the 1st Advent
    - Dresden, on the Saturday before the 4th Advent at the Lichterfest on Striezelmarkt
    - Freiberg, on the Saturday before the 2nd Advent, Mettenschicht
    - Geyer, on the 4th Advent
    - Lößnitz, on the 3rd Advent
    - Marienberg, on the 3rd Advent
    - Schneeberg, on 22 Jul, on Bergstreittag and on the 2nd Advent
    - Schwarzenberg, on the Saturday before the 3rd Advent
    - Seiffen, on the Saturdays before the 1st and 3rd Advents, with "living toys"
    - Stollberg, on the Saturday before the 3rd Advent
    - Thum, on the 1st Advent
    - Zwönitz, on the Saturday before the 1st Advent as a prelude to the Smelting Days (Hutzentage)
    - Zwickau, on the Saturday before the 2nd Advent
  - North Rhine-Westphalia
    - Bochum, German Mining Museum, Bochumer Knappentag
  - Lower Saxony
    - Goslar
  - Rhineland-Palatinate
    - Fell (Mosel)
    - Thomm (near Trier)
  - Saxony-Anhalt
    - Bad Suderode, on the 3rd Advent

== Literature ==
- Berufsfachschule für Tourismus Chemnitz (pub.): Bergparaden im Sächsischen Erzgebirge. Schriftenreihe Erzgebirgische Volkskunst, Vol. 10. Husum Verlag, Husum, 2000, ISBN 978-3-88042-964-2
