= Hewer =

Miner who loosens rock and minerals in a mine

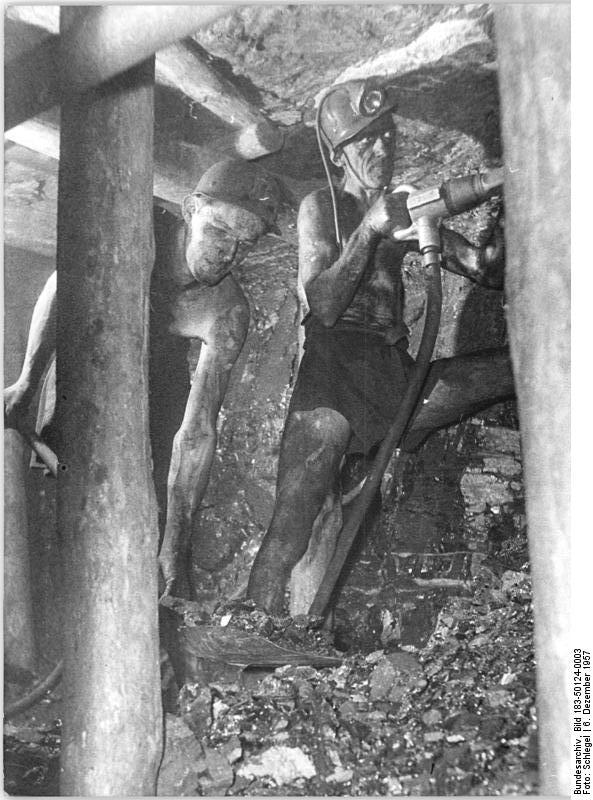
A hewer at the coalface, 1957

A hewer (German: Hauer or Häuer) is a miner who loosens rock and minerals in a mine. In medieval mining in Europe a Hauer was the name given to a miner who had passed his test (Hauerprüfung) as a hewer.

== Training ==
In Europe in former times, before he could become a hewer, the miner had to learn to be a "sorter boy" (Scheidejunge), identifying ores and separating the ore from the gangue. After that he would continue his training in the pit itself. Here, he had to learn further skills, initially as a putter (Hundtstößer literally "truck pusher"), transporting material around the mine in wagons. Only afterwards could he learn the skills, as an apprentice hewer (Lehrhäuer), that he would later need as a hewer. This form of training, the acquisition of knowledge by experience, was practised in mining until the First World War.

From the 1920s, the training of hewers was legally regulated as a result of union demands. Because, in the meantime, many skills required special knowledge, other tradesmen were gradually employed in mining and in the pits: initially metalworkers and, later, electricians. Following training and passing exams, the craftsman had to gain practical experience in order to sit for his hewer examination. This comprised a theoretical and a practical element.

The hewer exam could be taken once the miner was 20 years old. Between his apprenticeship as a sorter boy and the exam, the trainee hewer thus had at least two years of practical experience. After passing the hewer's exam there was a "graduation" event (Lossprechung).

== Hierarchy ==
An apprentice hewer was placed under a hewer and had to work under his direction. In the dressing area of the mine, old, former hewers were responsible for supervising the sorter boys. The hewer reported to the mine foreman or supervisor, the Steiger, also called the Dinghauer in some mines, or in smaller pits, the Hutmann.

The hewer was held in particular esteem, by the other miners in the pit, even though he actually had no authority over them. The Steiger, who were important officials in the early days of state mining, later became just ordinary employees.

== Promotion ==
Depending on diligence, skill and suitability, a hewer could be promoted to Hutmann or Steiger. Even an appointment as shift foreman (Schichtmeister), to the council of aldermen or jurats (Berggeschworenen) or as mine manager (Bergmeister) was possible. At the end of the 18th century, pit and operational officials were legally required to undertake engineering training at a mining academy or mining school. For this reason, the training of a Steiger could no longer be carried out simply through on the job training.

Hewers with many years of experience, the ability to lead men and who had sufficient mining and technical skills, could be promoted to the rank of supervisor (Aufsichtshauer) or senior hewer (Oberhauer). They were not, however, supervisory staff in the mining legal sense, but had the role of a team foreman.

If a hewer proved to be particularly expert, he would be appointed as a "master hewer" (Meisterhauer). He was then responsible for the technical training of junior miners. For this, the master hewer, was specially trained in a preparatory course, which culminated with an in-house examination. Master hewers reported to the mining authority.

A particularly experienced hewer who had worked for over 10 years and was at least 35 years old, could, if suitable, be appointed as a "leading hewer" (Fahrhauer). In order to achieve this he had to be deemed professionally suitable. His professional suitability was assessed on a so-called leading hewer's course (Fahrhauerkurs), which also acted as a certificate of proficiency. Leading hewers were responsible persons in the sense of the Federal Mining Law (Bundesberggesetz) and were given a written order of authority (Bestellschreiben).

== Hours of work and wages ==
The working hours of the hewers varied from region to region and ranged between 10–12 hours, but the time taking entering and leaving the mine was not counted. For one week of hired work in 1617 a hewer was paid just 18 Mariengroschen. This week's wages would not even buy a pound of butter at that time. Until the beginning of the 1950s, they worked 5½ days a week comprising 50 hours. Today, the hewer works 7 hours a day without coming to the surface.

== Gallery ==
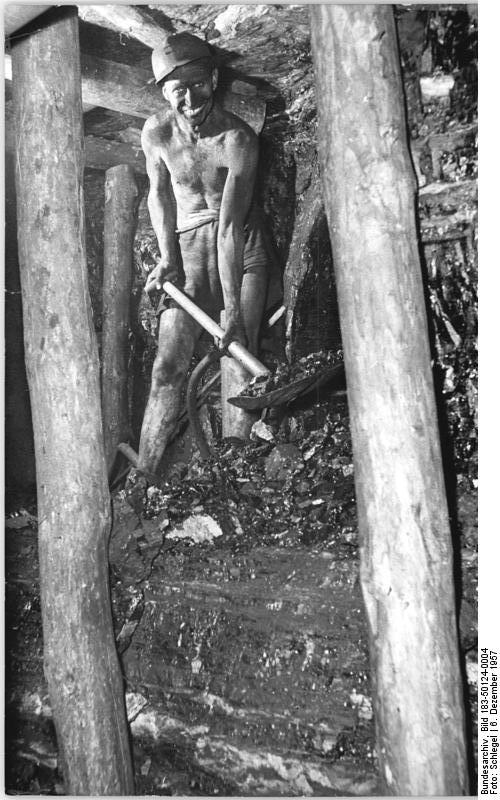
Loading work, 1957

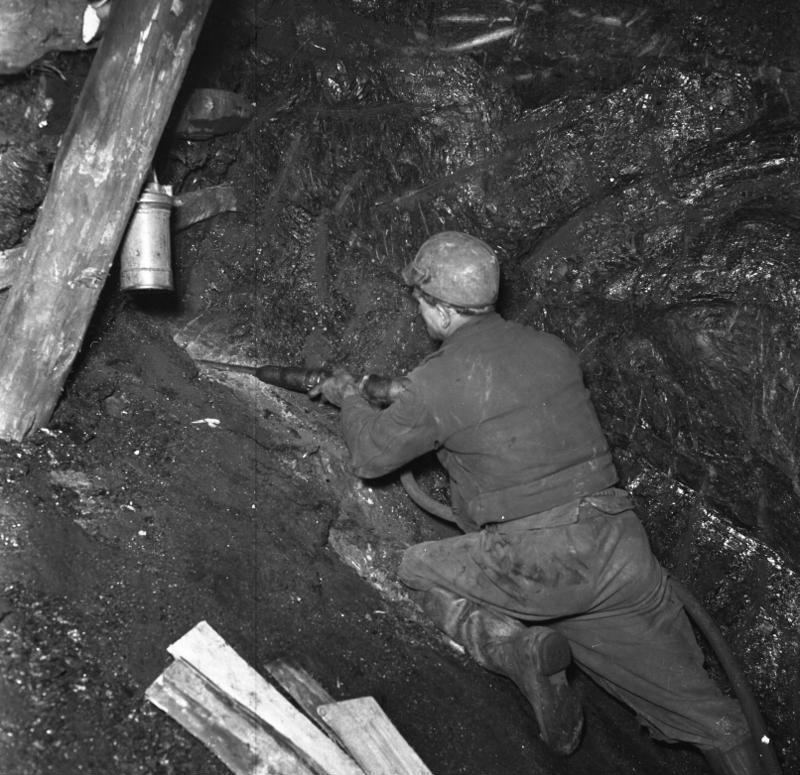
Coal extraction in a steeply lying seam, Ruhr, 1961

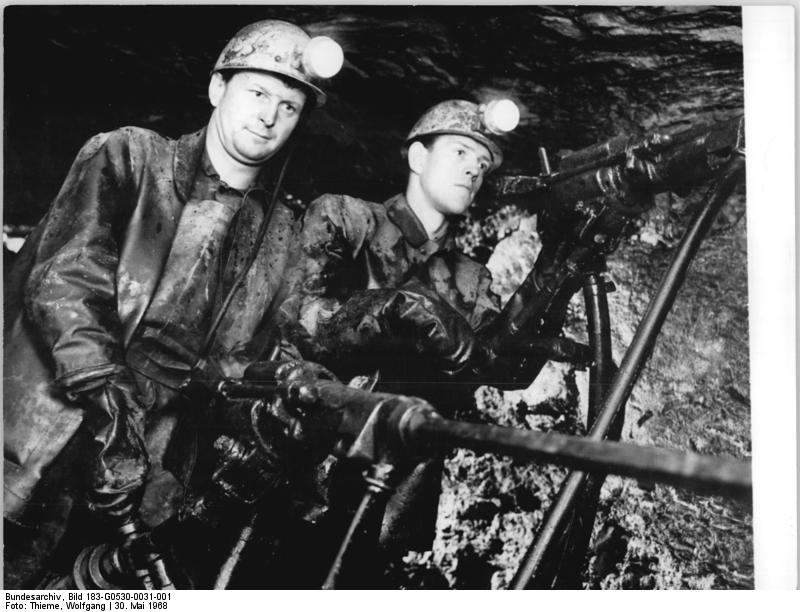
Heading in the Ore Mountains, 1968

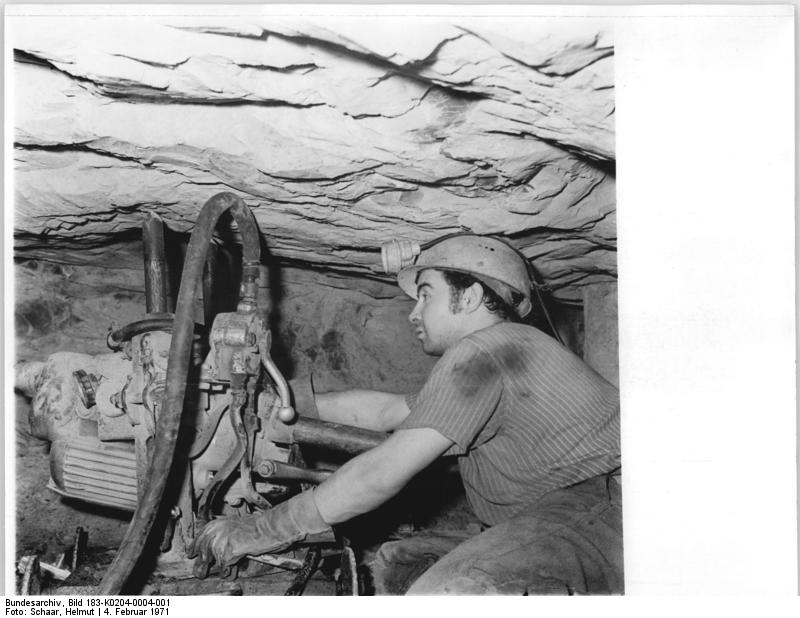
Horizontal drilling in the Mansfeld copper slate mine

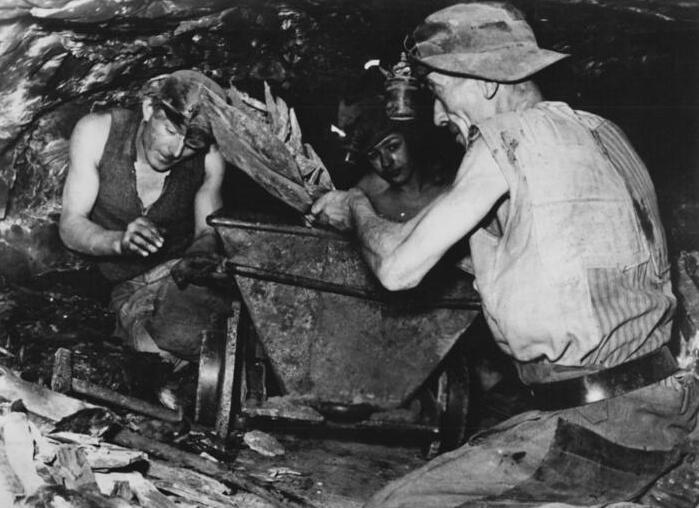
treatment of loose rock and ore, Mansfeld copper slate mine, 1952

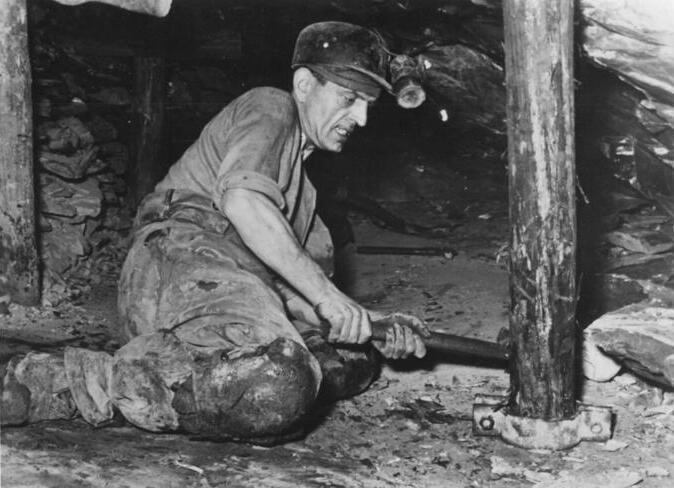
timbering and walling

== Literature ==
- Johann Eduard Heuchler, Hanns Freydank (ed.): Des Bergmanns Lebenslauf. 2. durchgesehene Auflage mit einem Nachwort von Hanns Freydank, Verlag Glückauf GmbH, Essen, 1940
