= Miner's cap =

Medieval headgear worn by miners

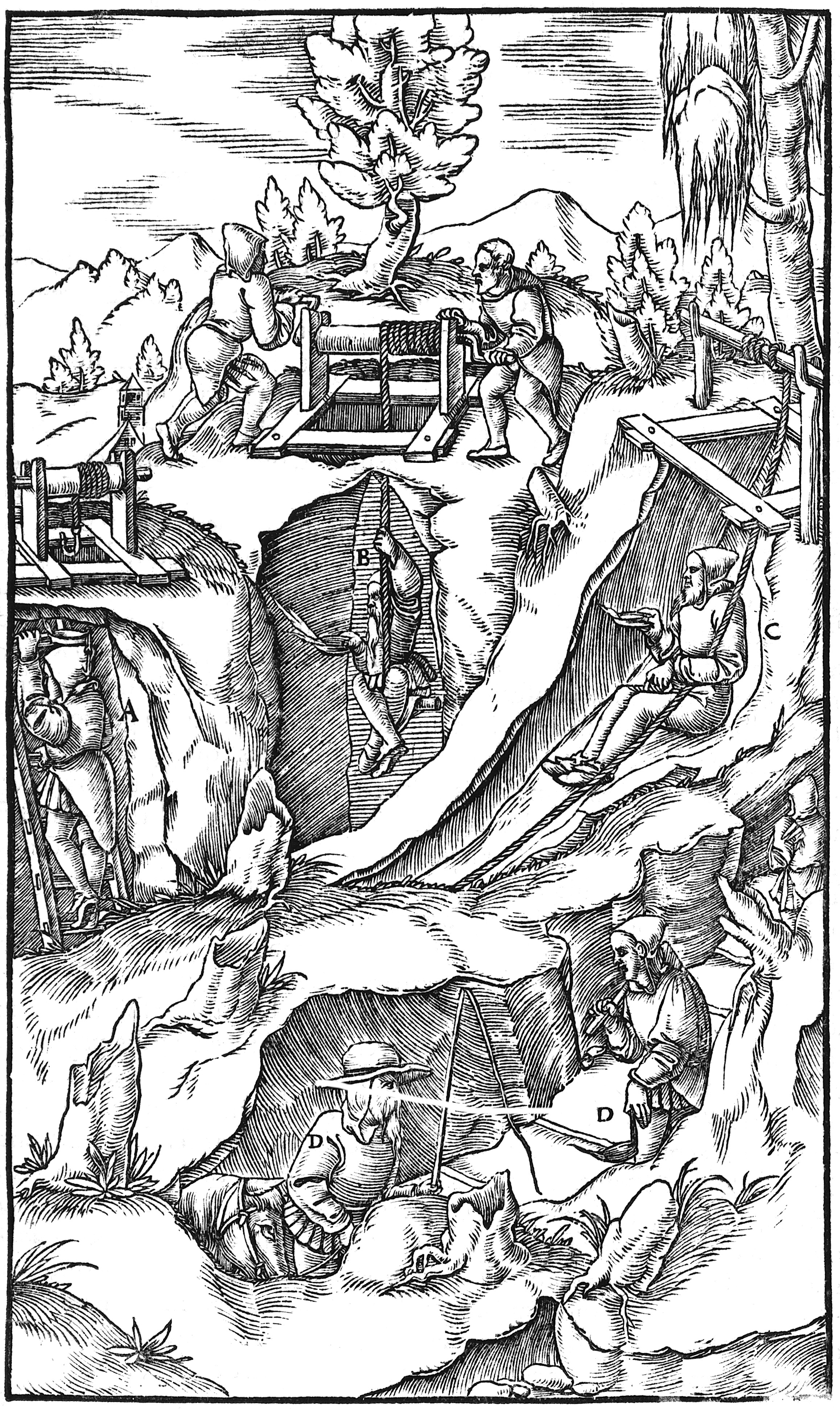
Medieval miners descending into the shaft (by Agricola)

The miner's cap (German: Fahrhaube) is part of the traditional miner's costume. It consists of a white material (linen) and served in the Middle Ages to protect the miner when descending below ground (unter Tage). Later it was replaced by the miner's hat (Fahrhut or Schachthut), from which the leather cap or helmet were developed and subsequently today's mining helmets.

== See also ==
- Miner's habit
- Mooskappe – miner's cap from the Harz Mountains
