= Schreckenberg =

Coordinates: 50°35′11″N 12°59′30″E

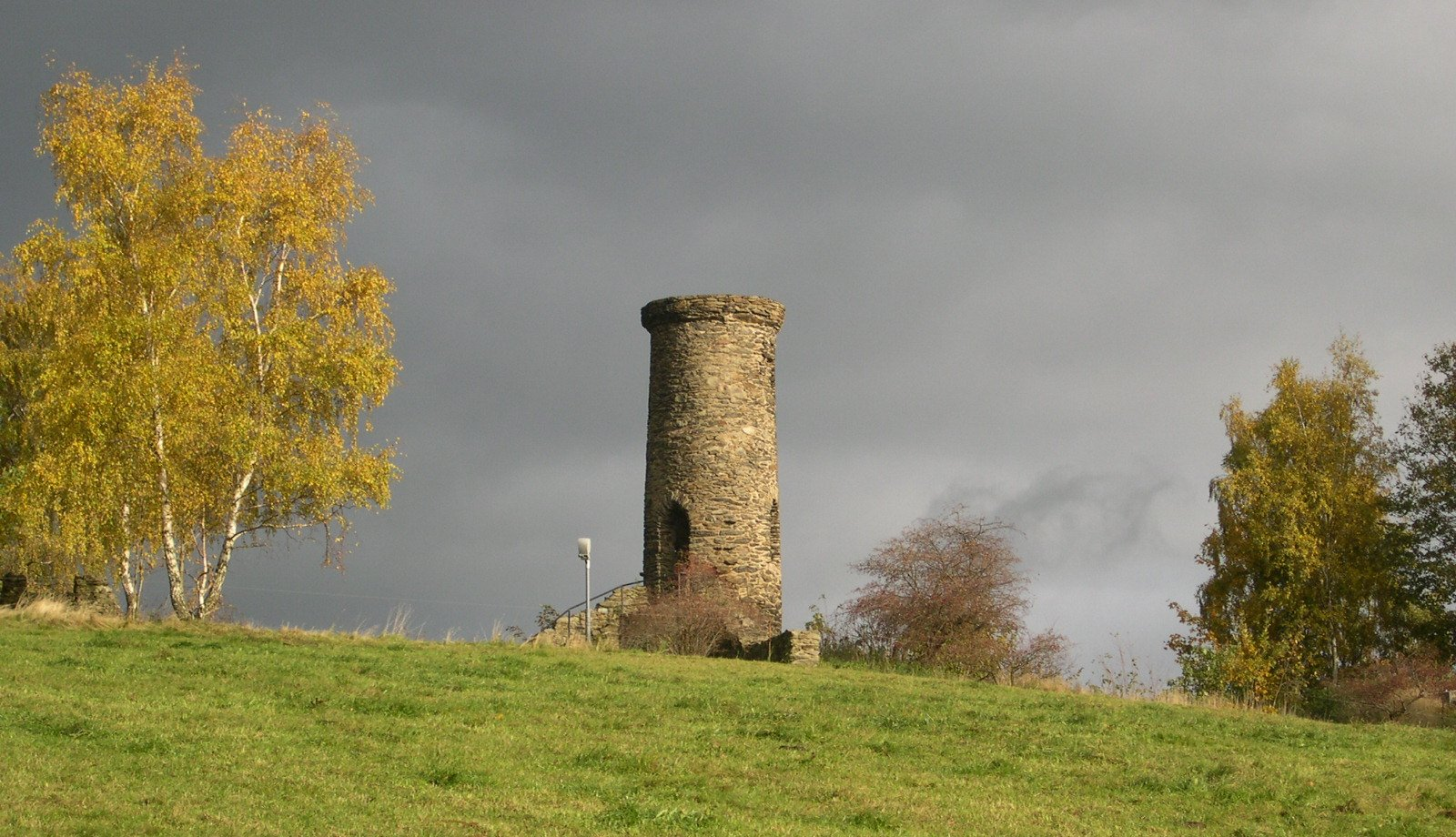
- View of the Schreckenberg ruins on the top of the mountain.

Highest point
- Elevation: 648.8 m (2,129 ft)

Geography
- Location: Saxony, Germany
- Parent range: Ore Mountains

Geology
- Mountain type: gneiss

The Schreckenberg is a mountain near Frohnau in the county of Erzgebirgskreis in the central Ore Mountains of Germany. It is 648.8 m above sea level (NHN). It is located one kilometre northwest of the town of Annaberg-Buchholz in the borough of Frohnau.

== History ==
The mountain is primarily of historical importance, since it is where Annaberg's silver ore mining began. On 28 October 1491, Caspar Nietzel came across a vein of silver ore not far from the Frohnau Upper Mill. As a result, in 1496, on the opposite bank of the river Sehma, the new town of Neustadt am Schreckenberg grew up, which soon received the name Sankt Annaberg ("Saint Anna's Mountain"). In 1498, Annaberg received the right to mint coins from the Wettins. The Annaberg Mint was set up in or next to the upper mill and for a short time minted the coin known as the Schreckenberger, a widespread means of payment in the Holy Roman Empire. The saying You're a rich Annaberger, you've got a bag full of Schreckenbergers probably dates to this time. The minting of Großgroschen ("big groschen") was also carried out in the mints at Freiberg, Leipzig, Dresden and Saalfeld. The last Schreckenbergers were minted in Dresden in 1571. In Annaberg, the Schreckenberger Engelsgroschen was only minted until 1547.

The intensive mining activity in the 15th and 16th centuries still characterizes the appearance of the mountain today. Its western flanks in particular are covered by numerous small spoil heaps. More recent are traces of the uranium mining that was carried out here briefly during the 1950s (Krönung-Fundgrube/Malwine).

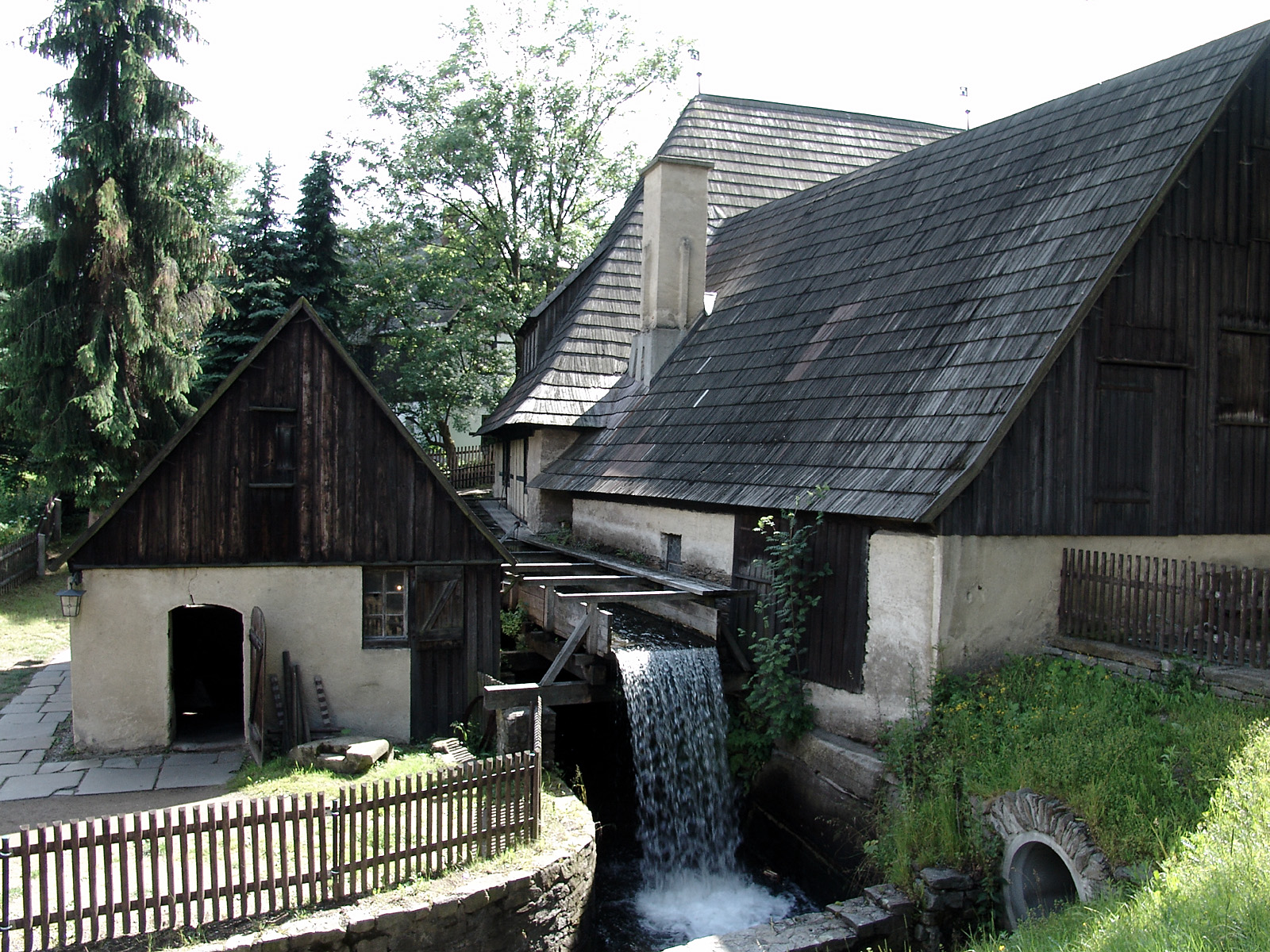
The Frohnau Hammer Mill below the Schreckenberg

Between 1854 and 1856 a Romantic-style castle ruin was built on the Schreckenberg, which still dominates the view of the mountain today. The castle tower with the remains of ruins indicated was financed from the private funds of wealthy Annaberg townsfolk and by the local company Eisenstuck & Co and was built by the unemployed workers and journeymen. The Privy Councillor Carl Friedrich Reiche-Eisenstuck is considered the initiator. At a time of severe economic recession, the construction work served in particular as public relief work - in today's sense of a job creation measure.

From the summit there is a good view of the mountain town of Annaberg.
