= Sehma =

Sehma may refer to:

- Sehma (river), a river of Saxony, Germany
- Sehma, Sehmatal, a district of the municipality Sehmatal in Saxony, Germany
