= Trip hammer =

Type of blacksmithing tool

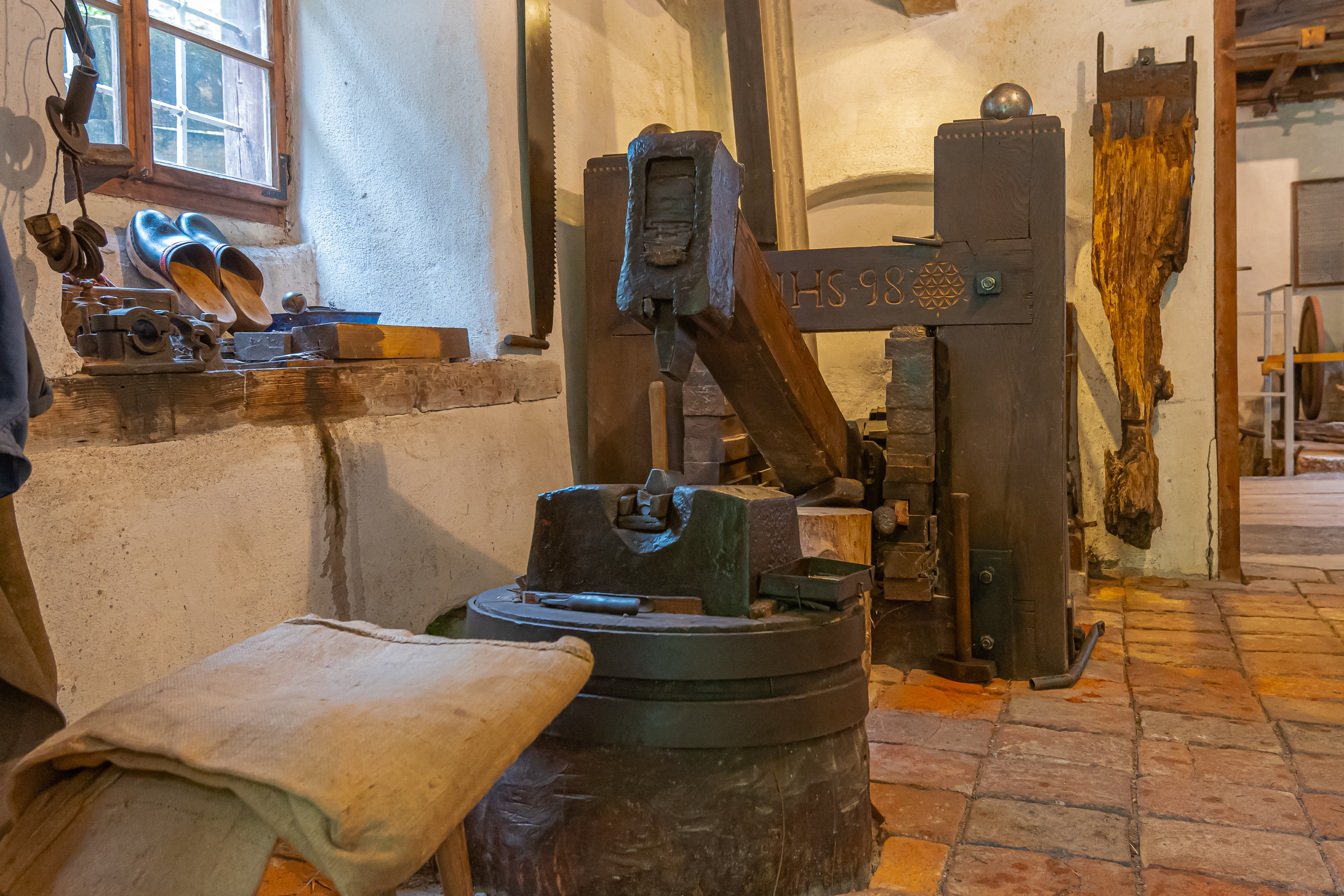
A 1960s trip hammer placed at Trattenbach village, Lower Austria

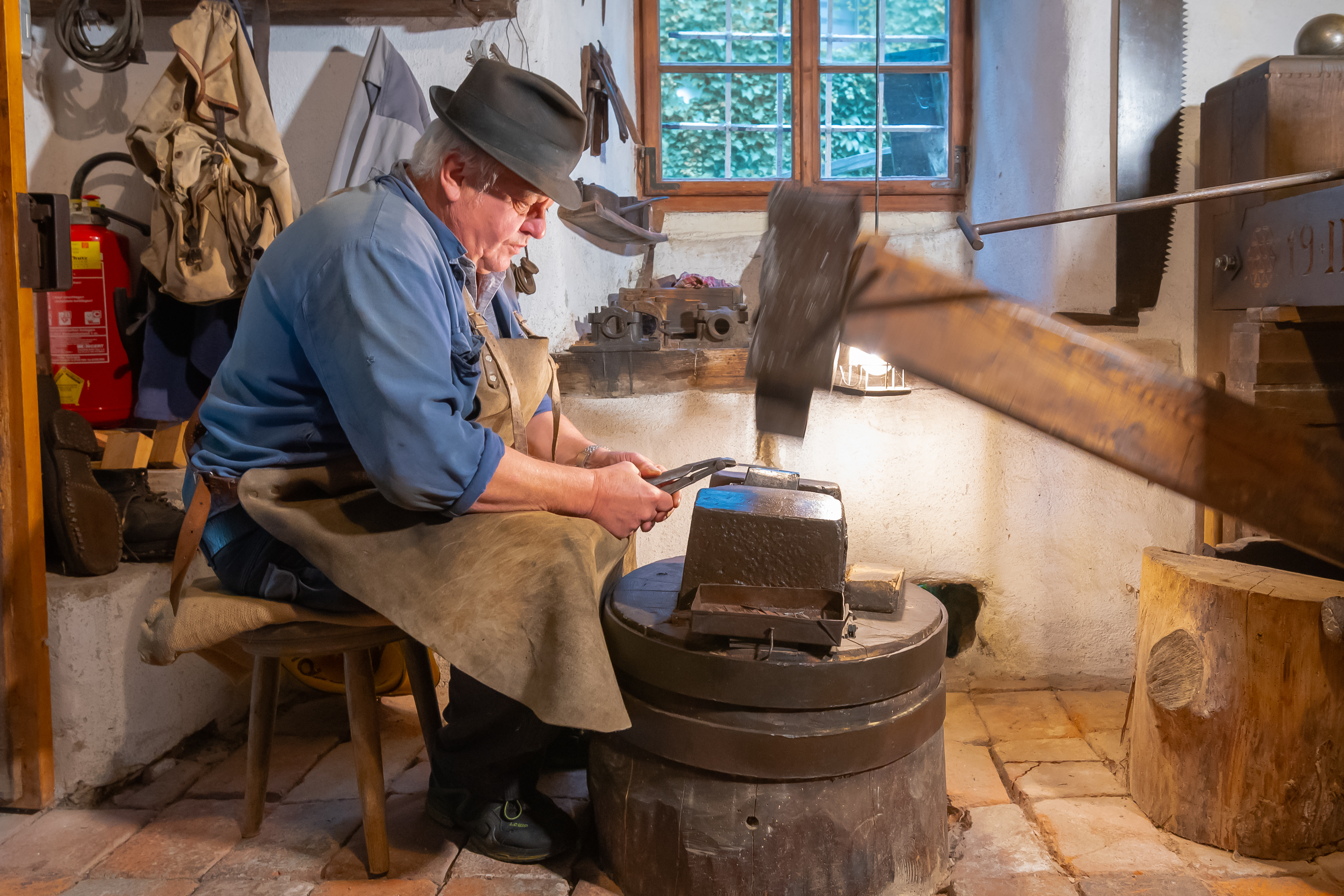
The same trip hammer in operation, shaping a folding knife at the strike area

A trip hammer, also known as a tilt hammer or helve hammer, is a massive powered hammer, usually raised by a cam and then released to fall under the force of gravity. Historically, trip hammers were often powered hydraulically by a water wheel. One or more trip hammers were set up in a forge, also known variously as a hammer mill, hammer forge or hammer works.

Trip hammers are known to have been used in Imperial China since the Western Han dynasty. They also existed in the contemporary Greco-Roman world, with more evidence of their use in medieval Europe during the 12th century. During the Industrial Revolution the trip hammer fell out of favor and was replaced with the power hammer. Often multiple hammers were powered via a set of line shafts, pulleys and belts from a centrally located power supply.

Traditional uses of trip hammers include pounding, decorticating and polishing of grain in agriculture. In mining, trip hammers were used for crushing metal ores into small pieces, although a stamp mill was more usual for this. In finery forges they were used for drawing out blooms made from wrought iron into more workable bar iron. They were also used for fabricating various articles of wrought iron, latten (an early form of brass), steel and other metals.

== Early history ==
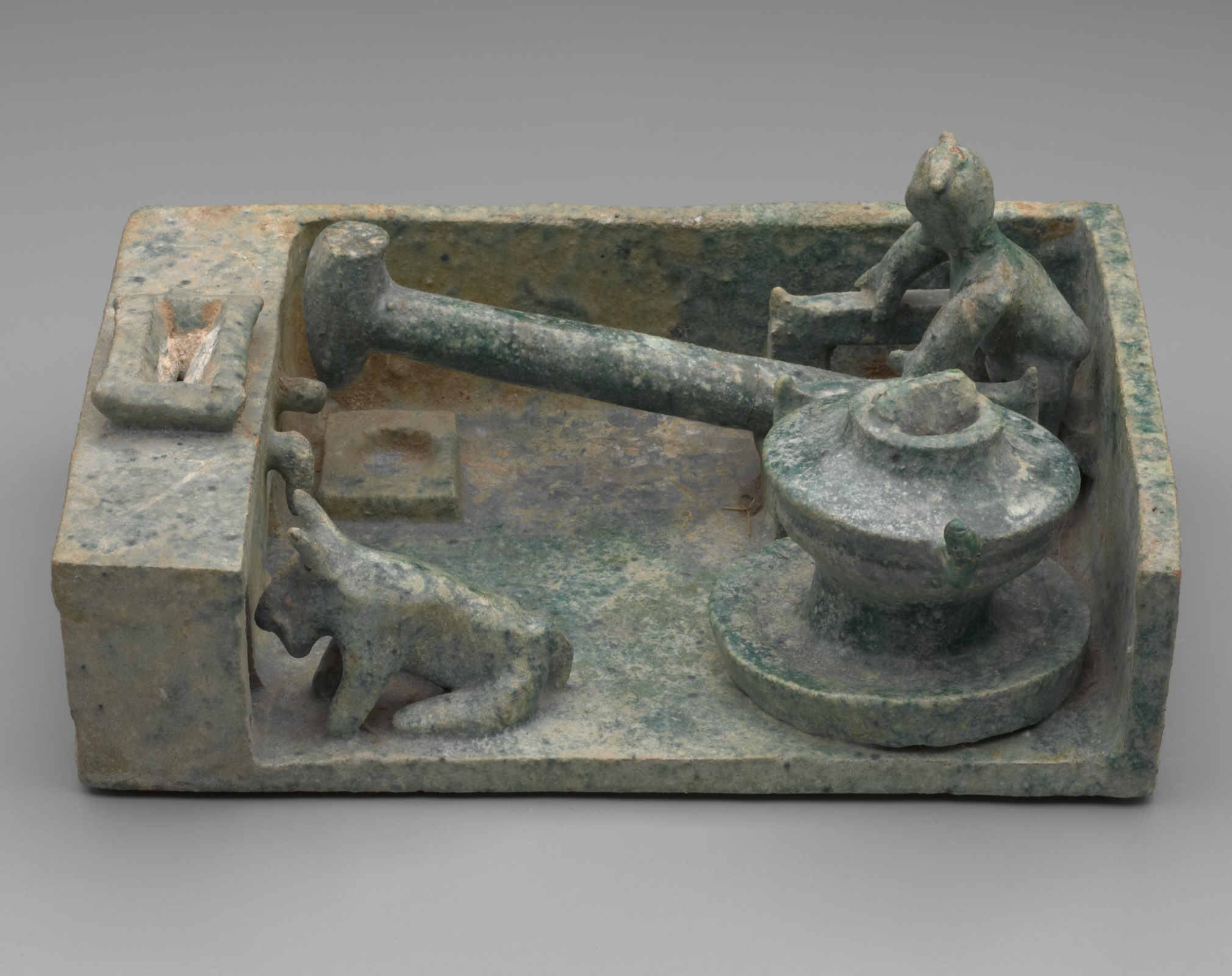
Model of a grain processing workshop with a trip hammer. China, Eastern Han dynasty, 25-220 CE

=== China ===
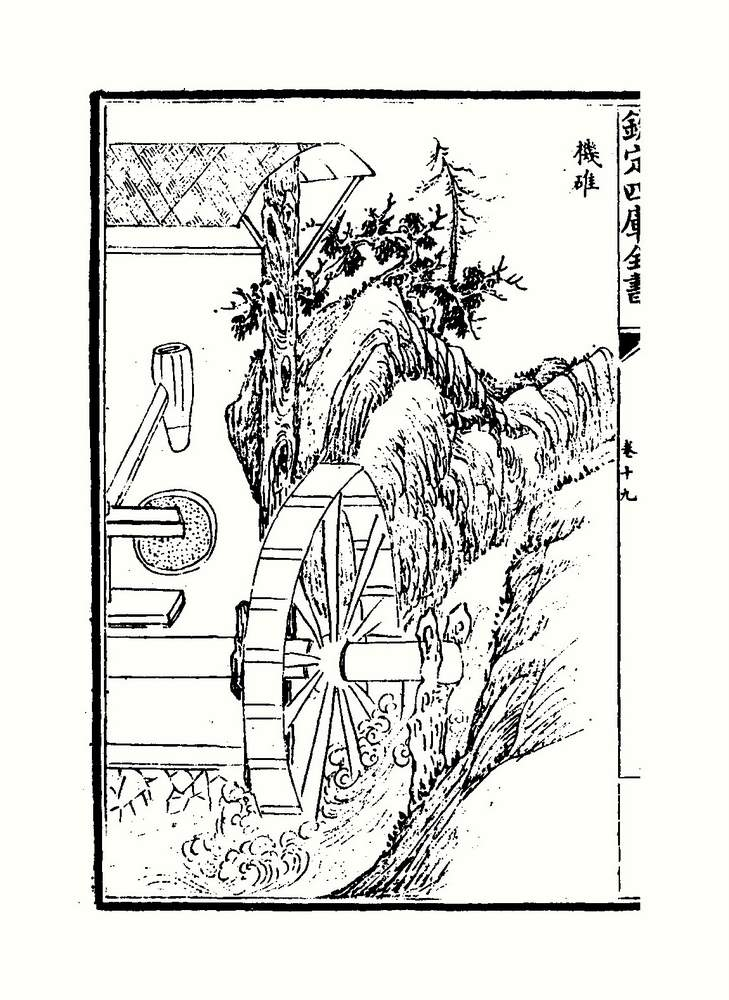
A water powered trip hammer from the Nong Shu by Wang Zhen (fl. 1290–1333)

In ancient China, the trip hammer evolved out of the use of the mortar and pestle, which in turn gave rise to the treadle-operated tilt-hammer (Chinese: 碓 Pinyin: dui; Wade-Giles: tui). The latter was a simple device employing a lever and fulcrum (operated by pressure applied by the weight of one's foot to one end), which featured a series of catches or lugs on the main revolving shaft as well. This device enabled the labor of pounding, often in the decorticating and polishing of grain, and avoided manual pounding with hand and arm.

Although Chinese historians assert that its origins may span as far back as the Zhou dynasty (1050 BC–221 BC), the British sinologist Joseph Needham regards the earliest texts to describe the device are the Jijiupian dictionary of 40 BC, Yang Xiong's Fangyan of 15 BC, as well as the "best statement" the Xin Lun written by Huan Tan about 20 AD (during the usurpation of Wang Mang). The latter book states that the legendary Fu Xi was the one responsible for the pestle and mortar (which evolved into the tilt-hammer and then trip hammer device). Although the author speaks of the mythological Fu Xi, a passage of his writing gives hint that the waterwheel and trip-hammer were in widespread use by the 1st century AD in China (for water-powered Chinese metallurgy, see Du Shi):

Fu Hsi invented the pestle and mortar, which is so useful, and later on it was cleverly improved in such a way that the whole weight of the body could be used for treading on the tilt-hammer (tui), thus increasing the efficiency ten times. Afterwards the power of animals—donkeys, mules, oxen, and horses—was applied by means of machinery, and water-power too used for pounding, so that the benefit was increased a hundredfold.

However, this passage as well as other early references from the Han era may rather refer to a water lever, not a trip hammer. Later research, pointing to two contemporary Han era funeral wares depicting hydraulic hammers, proved that vertical waterwheels were used to power batteries of trip hammers during the Han dynasty.

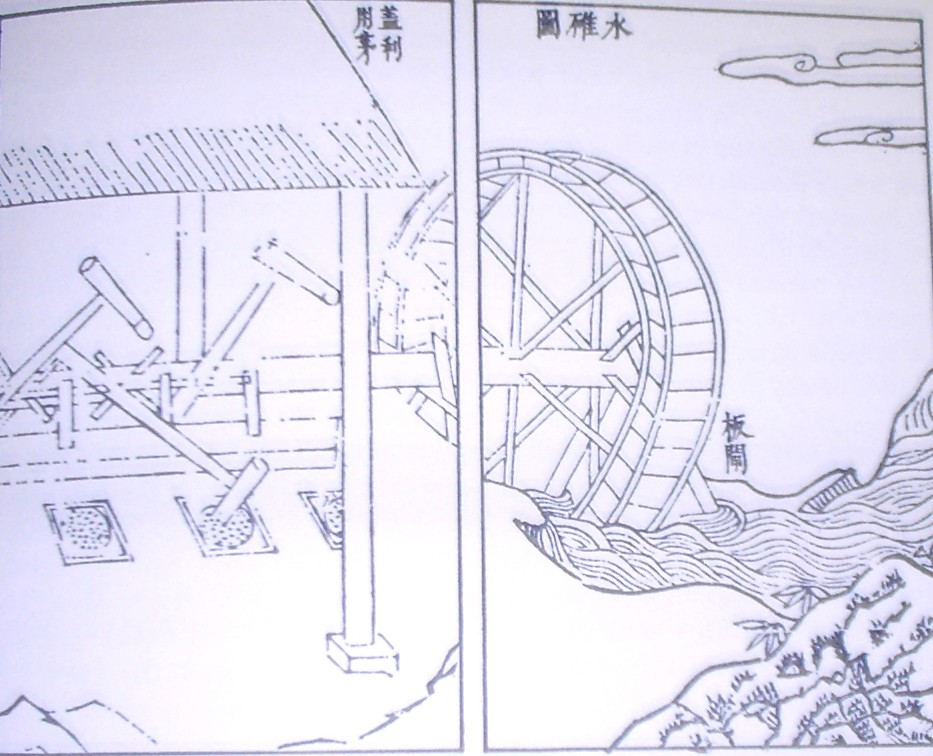
Hydrodynamic powered trip hammer set, illustration from the Tiangong Kaiwu encyclopedia of 1637, written by Song Yingxing (1587–1666)

With his description, it is seen that the out-of-date Chinese term for pestle and mortar (dui, tui) would soon be replaced with the Chinese term for the water-powered trip-hammer (Chinese: 水碓; pinyin: shuǐ duì; Wade–Giles: shui tui. The Han dynasty scholar and poet Ma Rong (79–166 AD) mentioned in one of his poems of hammers 'pounding in the water-echoing caves'. As described in the Hou Han Shu, in 129 AD the official Yu Xu gave a report to Emperor Shun of Han that trip hammers were being exported from Han China to the Western Qiang people by way of canals through the Qilian Mountains. In his Rou Xing Lun, the government official Kong Rong (153–208 AD) remarked that the invention of the trip hammer was an excellent example of a product created by intelligent men during his own age (comparing the relative achievements of the sages of old). During the 3rd century AD, the high government official and engineer Du Yu established the use of combined trip hammer batteries (lian zhi dui), which employed several shafts that were arranged to work off one large waterwheel. In Chinese texts of the 4th century, there are written accounts of men possessing and operating hundreds of trip hammer machines, such as the venerable mathematician Wang Rong (died 306 AD), Deng Yu (died 326 AD), and Shi Chong (died 300 AD), responsible for the operation of hundreds of trip hammers in over thirty governmental districts throughout China. There are numerous references to trip hammers during the Tang dynasty (618–907 AD) and Song dynasty (960–1279), and there are Ming dynasty (1368–1644) references that report the use of trip hammers in papermills of Fujian Province.

Although Chinese trip hammers in China were sometimes powered by the more efficient vertical-set waterwheel, the Chinese often employed the horizontal-set waterwheel in operating trip hammers, along with recumbent hammers. The recumbent hammer was found in Chinese illustrations by 1313 AD, with the publishing of Wang Zhen's Nong Shu book on ancient and contemporary (medieval) metallurgy in China. There were also illustrations of trip hammers in an encyclopedia of 1637, written by Song Yingxing (1587–1666).

The Chinese use of the cam remained confined to the horizontal type and was limited to a "small variety of machines" that included only rice hulling and much later mica-pounders, paper mills and saw mills, while fulling stocks, ore stamps or forge hammers were unknown.

=== Classical antiquity ===
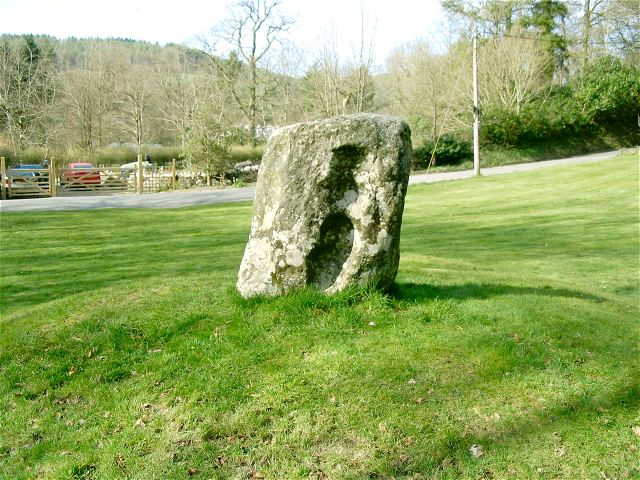
The regular indentations on the Carreg Pumsaint and similar mortar blocks are believed to stem from mechanically operated trip hammers.

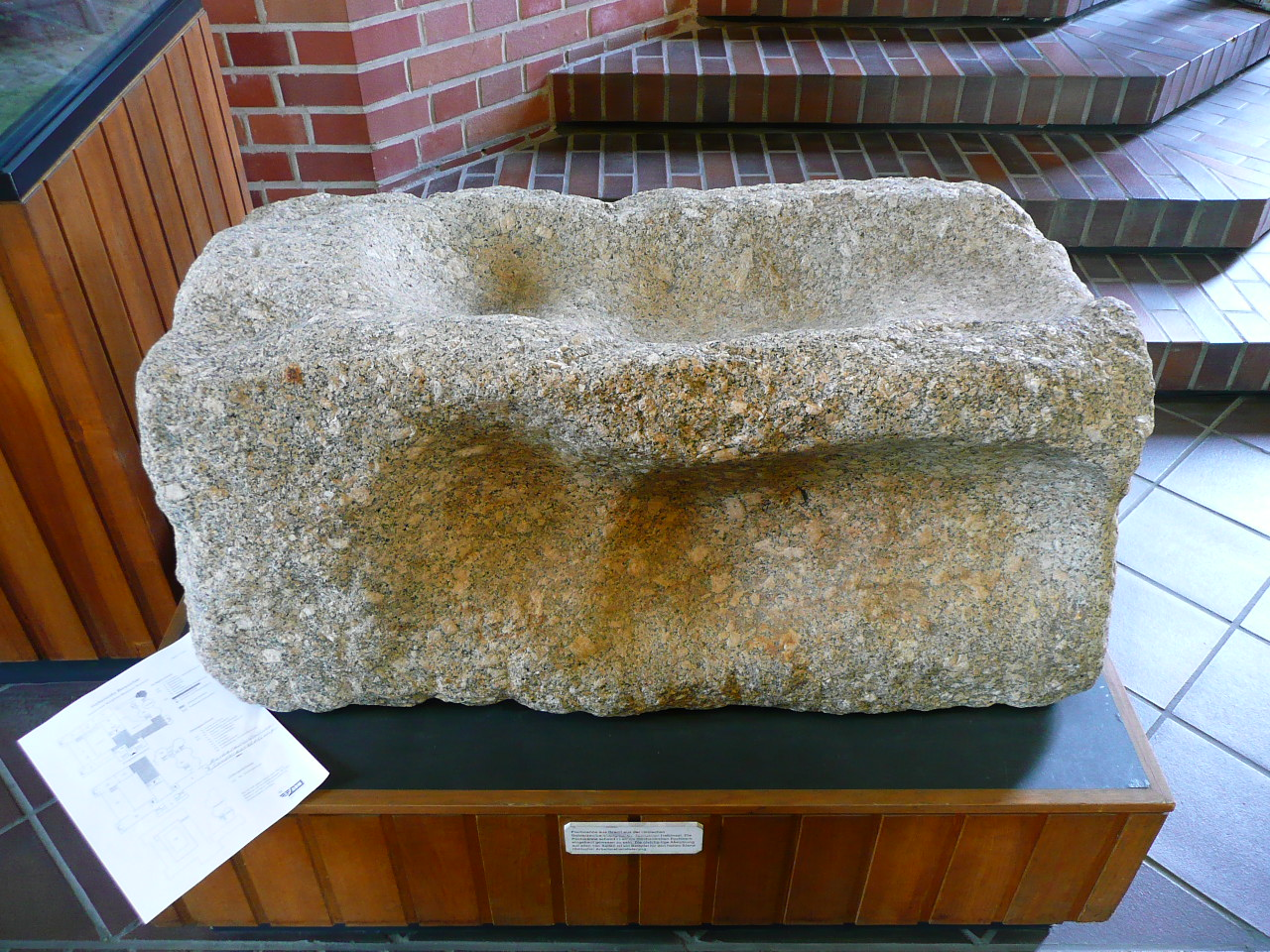
Roman stone anvil for a stamp battery

The main components for water-powered trip hammers – water wheels, cams, and hammers – were known in the Hellenistic world. Early cams are in evidence in water-powered automata from the 3rd century BC. According to M.J.T. Lewis, a flute player whose mechanism was described by the Persian Banū Mūsā brothers in the 9th century AD and can be "reasonably" attributed to Apollonius of Perge, functions on the principle of water-powered trip hammers.

The Roman scholar Pliny (Natural History XVIII, 23.97) indicates that water-driven pestles had become fairly widespread in Italy by the first century AD:

The greater part of Italy uses an unshod pestle and also wheels which water turns as it flows past, and a trip-hammer [mola]".

While some scholars have viewed this passage to mean a watermill, later scholarship argued that mola must refer to water-powered trip hammers which were used for the pounding and hulling of grain. Their mechanical character is also suggested by an earlier reference of Lucius Pomponius (fl. 100–85 BC) to a fuller's mill, a type of mill that has been operated at all times with falling stocks. However, it has been pointed out that the translation of Pomponius' fragmentary text could be faulty, and relies on translating mola, which is often thought to mean either a mill or millstone, to instead refer to a water powered trip hammer. Grain-pounders with pestles, as well as ordinary watermills, are attested as late as the middle of the 5th century AD in a monastery founded by Romanus of Condat in the remote Jura region, indicating that the knowledge of trip hammers continued into the early Middle Ages.

At the Italian site of Saepinum excavators have recently unearthed a late antique water mill that may have employed trip hammers for tanning, the earliest evidence of its kind in a classical context.

The widest application of trip hammers seems to have occurred in Roman mining, where ore from deep veins was first crushed into small pieces for further processing. Here, the regularity and spacing of large indentations on stone anvils indicate the use of cam-operated ore stamps, much like the devices of later medieval mining. Such mechanically deformed anvils have been found at numerous Roman silver and gold mining sites in Western Europe, including at Dolaucothi (Wales), and on the Iberian Peninsula, where the datable examples are from the 1st and 2nd century AD. At Dolaucothi, these trip-hammers were hydraulic-driven and possibly also at other Roman mining sites, where the large-scale use of the hushing and ground sluicing technique meant that large amounts of water were directly available for powering the machines. However, none of the Spanish and Portuguese anvils can be convincingly associated with mill sites, though most mines had water sources and leat systems which could easily be harnessed. Likewise, the dating of the Pumsaint stone to the Roman era did not address that the stone could have been moved, and relies on a series of interlinked probabilities which would jeopardize the conclusion of a Roman dating should any of them unravel.

=== Medieval Europe ===
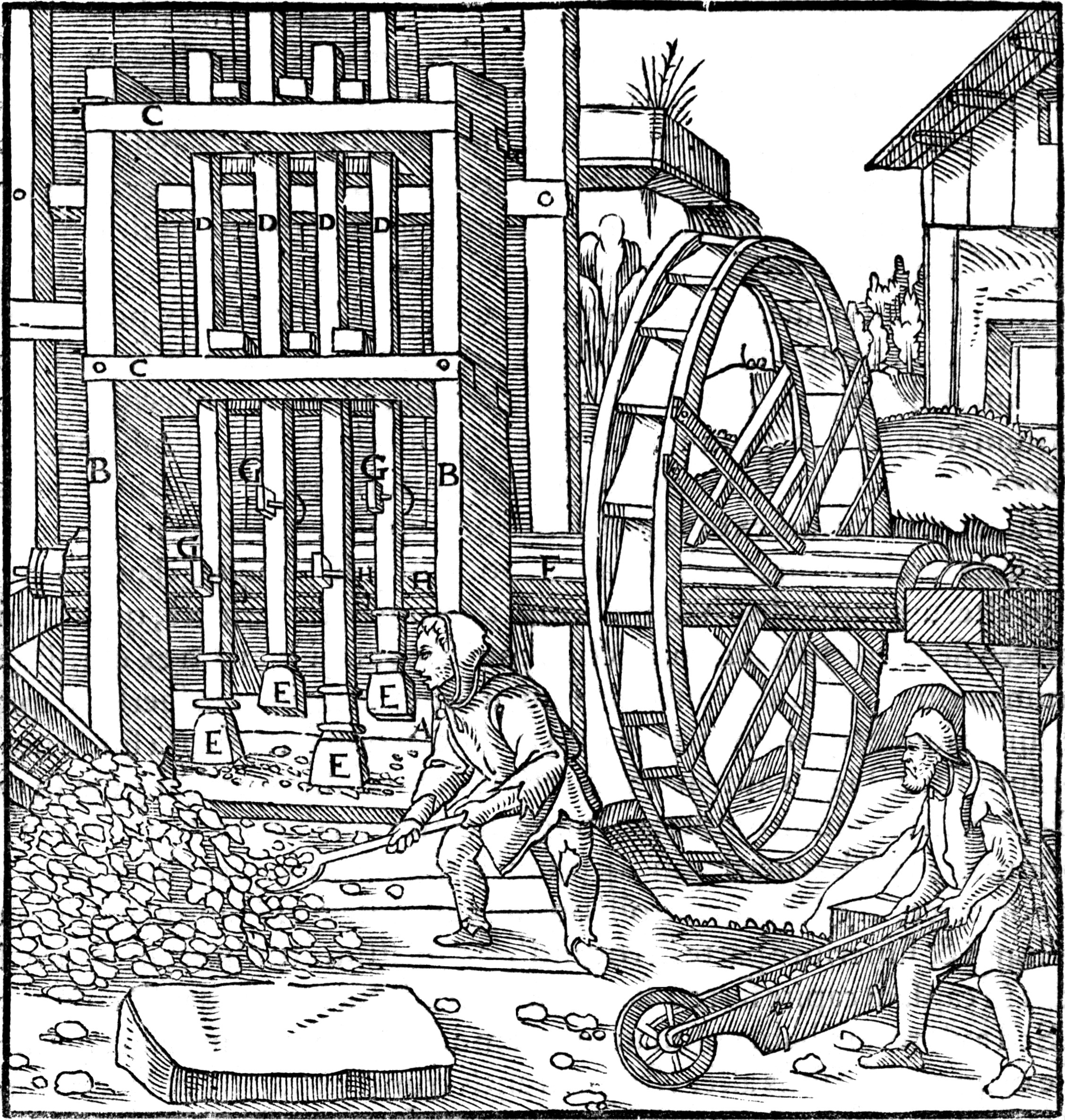
Water-powered ore crusher by Georgius Agricola

Water-powered and mechanised trip hammers reappeared in medieval Europe by the 12th century. Their use was described in medieval written sources of Styria (in modern-day Austria), written in 1135 and another in 1175 AD. Medieval French sources of the years 1116 and 1249 both record the use of mechanised trip hammers used in the forging of wrought iron. Medieval European trip hammers by the 15th century were most often in the shape of the vertical pestle stamp-mill, although they employed more frequent use of the vertical waterwheel than earlier Chinese versions (which often used the horizontal waterwheel). The well-known Renaissance artist and inventor Leonardo da Vinci often sketched trip hammers for use in forges and even file-cutting machinery, those of the vertical pestle stamp-mill type. The oldest depicted European illustration of a forge-hammer is perhaps the A Description of the Northern Peoples of Olaus Magnus, dated to 1565 AD. In this woodcut image, there is the scene of three martinets and a waterwheel working wood and leather bellows of the Osmund Bloomery furnace. The recumbent hammer was first depicted in European artwork in an illustration by Sandrart and Zonca (dated 1621 AD).

== Types ==
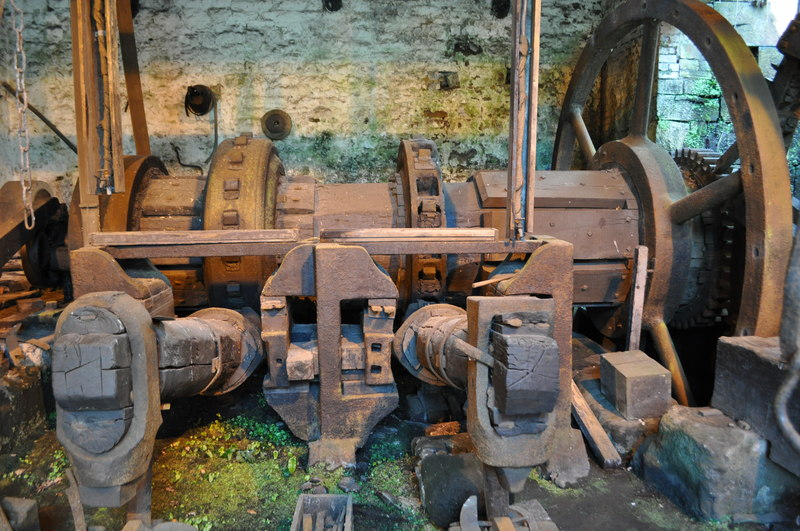
Water-powered hammers at Abbeydale Industrial Hamlet

A trip hammer has the head mounted at the end of a recumbent helve, hence the alternative name of helve hammer. The choice of which type was used in a particular context may have depended on the strain that its operation imposed on the helve. This was normally of wood, mounted in a cast-iron ring (called the hurst) where it pivoted. However, in the 19th century the heaviest helves were sometimes a single casting, incorporating the hurst.

The tilt hammer or tail helve hammer has a pivot at the centre of the helve on which it is mounted, and is lifted by pushing the opposite end to the head downwards. In practice, the head on such hammers seems to have been limited to one hundredweight (about 50 kg), but a very rapid stroke rate was possible. This made it suitable for drawing iron down to small sizes suitable for the cutlery trades. There were therefore many such forges known as 'tilts' around Sheffield. They were also used in brass battery works for making brass (or copper) pots and pans. In battery works (at least) it was possible for one power source to operate several hammers. In Germany, tilt hammers of up to 300 kg were used in hammer mills to forge iron. Surviving, working hammers, powered by water wheels, may be seen, for example, at the Frohnauer Hammer in the Ore Mountains.

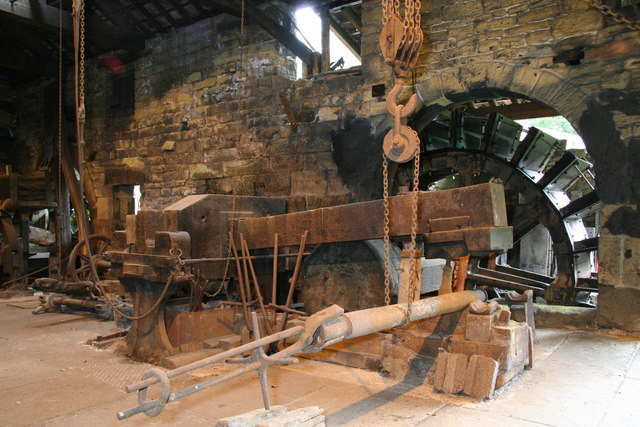
Belly helve hammer at Wortley Top Forge

The belly helve hammer was the kind normally found in a finery forge, used for making pig iron into forgeable bar iron. This was lifted by cams striking the helve between the pivot and the head. The head usually weighed quarter of a ton. This was probably the case because the strain on a wooden helve would have been too great if the head were heavier.

The nose helve hammer seems to have been unusual until the late 18th or early 19th century. This was lifted beyond the head. Surviving nose helves and those in pictures appear to be of cast iron.

== Demise ==
The steam-powered drop hammer replaced the trip hammer (at least for the largest forgings). James Nasmyth invented it in 1839 and patented it in 1842.

== See also ==
- Abbeydale Industrial Hamlet
- Dorfchemnitz Iron Hammer Mill
- Finch Foundry
- Freibergsdorf Hammer Mill
- Frohnauer Hammer Mill
- Wortley Top Forge

== Bibliography ==
- Brun, Jean-Pierre; Leguilloux, Martine Leguilloux (2014). "Chapitre 8. Une tannerie et son moulin hydraulique ?". Les installations artisanales romaines de Saepinum. Tannerie et moulin hydraulique. Archéologie de l’artisanat antique 7. Naples: Centre Jean Bérard. pp. 147–170. ISBN 9782380500042. ISSN 1590-3869.
- Sim, David and Ridge, Isable: "Iron for the Eagles" (2002)
- Burnham, Barry C.: "Dolaucothi-Pumsaint: Survey and Excavations at a Roman Gold-mining Complex" (2004)
- Lewis, M. J. T. (1997), Millstone and Hammer. The Origins of Water Power, The University of Hull Press, ISBN 0-85958-657-X
- Needham, Joseph; Wang, Ling. (1986) [1965]. Science and Civilization in China: Volume 4, Physics and Physical Technology, Part 2, Mechanical Engineering. Taipei: Caves Books Ltd (reprint edition of Cambridge & New York: Cambridge University Press). ISBN 0-521-05803-1.
- Wilson, Andrew (2002), "Machines, Power and the Ancient Economy", The Journal of Roman Studies, vol. 92, pp. 1–32
- Wilson, Andrew (2020), "Roman Water-Power. Chronological Trends and Geographical Spread", in Erdkamp, Paul; Verboven, Koenraad; Zuiderhoek, Arjan (eds.), Capital, Investment, and Innovation in the Roman World, Oxford University Press, pp. 147–194, ISBN 978-0-19-884184-5
- Song, Yingxing, translated with preface by E-Tu Zen Sun and Shiou-Chuan Sun: T'ien-Kung K'ai-Wu: Chinese Technology in the Seventeenth Century. (University Park: Pennsylvania State University Press 1966).
- Xiaolei, Shi (2019), "The Hydraulic Tilt Hammer in Ancient China", in Baichun, Zhang; Marco, Ceccarelli (eds.), Explorations in the History and Heritage of Machines and Mechanisms, Springer Nature Switzerland AG, pp. 113–122, ISBN 978-3-030-03537-2
- Flohr, Miko (2013), The World of the Fullo: Work, Economy and Society in Roman Italy, Oxford University Press, p. 102, ISBN 978-0199659357
