= Finch Foundry =

19th century forge in Devon, England

Coordinates: 50°43′50″N 3°55′34″W

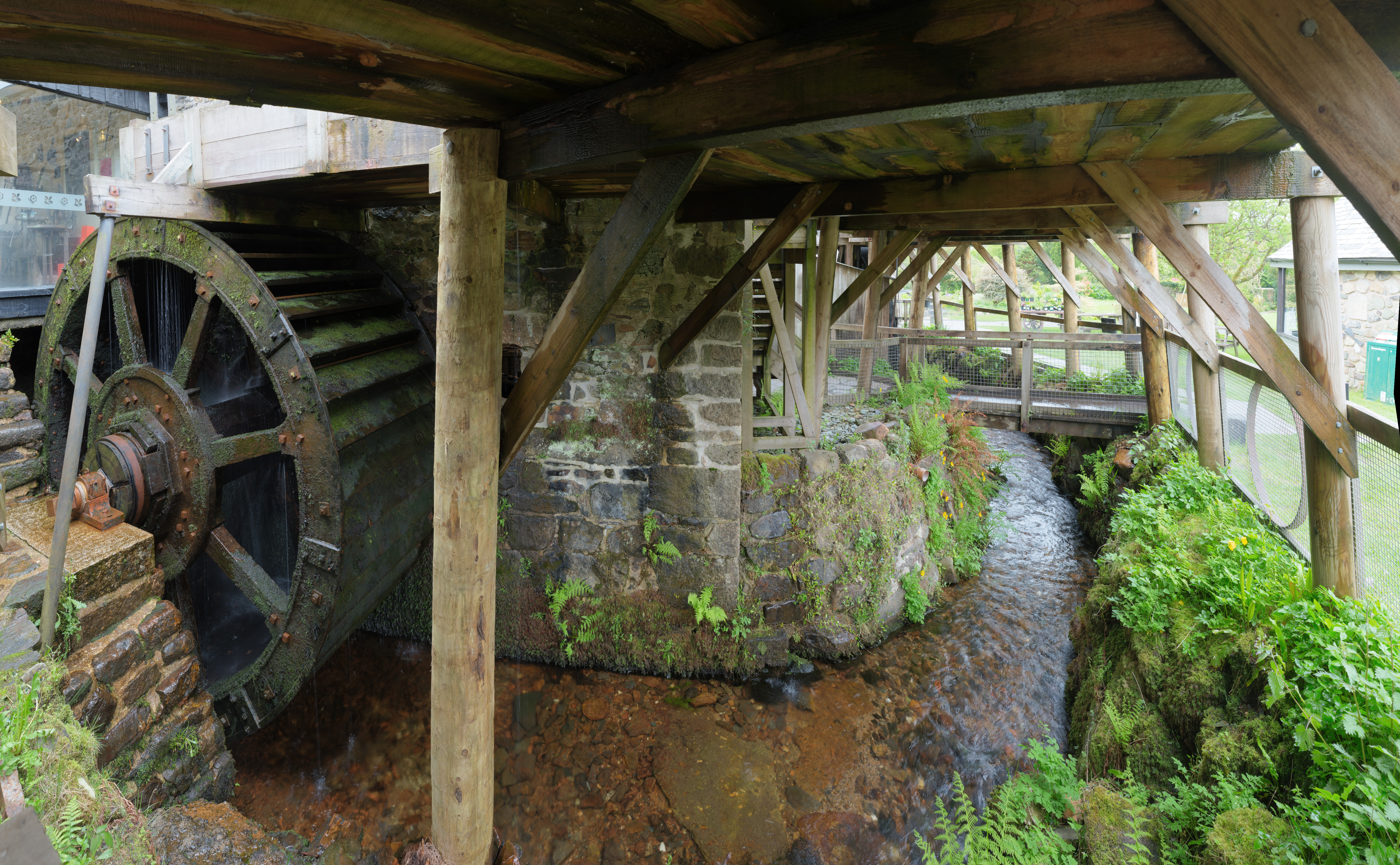
One of Finch Foundry's water wheels

Finch Foundry is a 19th-century water-powered forge situated in Sticklepath, a small village at the foot of a steep hill on the road from Exeter to Okehampton, Devon, England. Its original name was Manor Mills, and it was originally used to produce agricultural and mining hand tools. At its peak, the foundry produced around 400 edge-tools a day.

The founder was William Finch, who was born in 1779. Several generations of the family ran the foundry, most notably Rebecca Finch, who managed the business at its peak.

It remained an active foundry until 1960 when the roof collapsed and has been a National Trust property since 1994. It contains examples of a tilt hammer, drop hammer, and shear hammer all powered by water wheels. The Trust maintains the forge in working order and demonstrations of the tools are given.

The Finch Foundry (originally Manor Mills) was operated by John Browning and John Stanbury in 1805. The foundry was formed by William Finch in 1814 in the cloth mill, and the deeds show that at this time William Finch was John Stanbury's tennant. The Finch family operated the foundry continuously from 1814 to the end of the First World War, when the Finch brothers, Albany, James and Thomas, finally formed a partnership and bought the property so that they could expand. This expansion survived the depression of the 1930s until the death of Albany Finch in 1945. After this, the family business became a limited company under the directors Ralph Finch, Charles Bowden and Richard Barron. The company survived until the collapse of the south wall of the foundry in 1960.

== Late 20th Century ==
After what happened to the south wall in 1960, Richard Barron bought out the remaining directors and set about the creation of a museum of rural industry. It is much regretted that he died in 1964 with his concept barely started. Since his death the trustees of the Finch Foundry have carried on his idea of forming this Rural Industrial Museum.

== Gallery ==
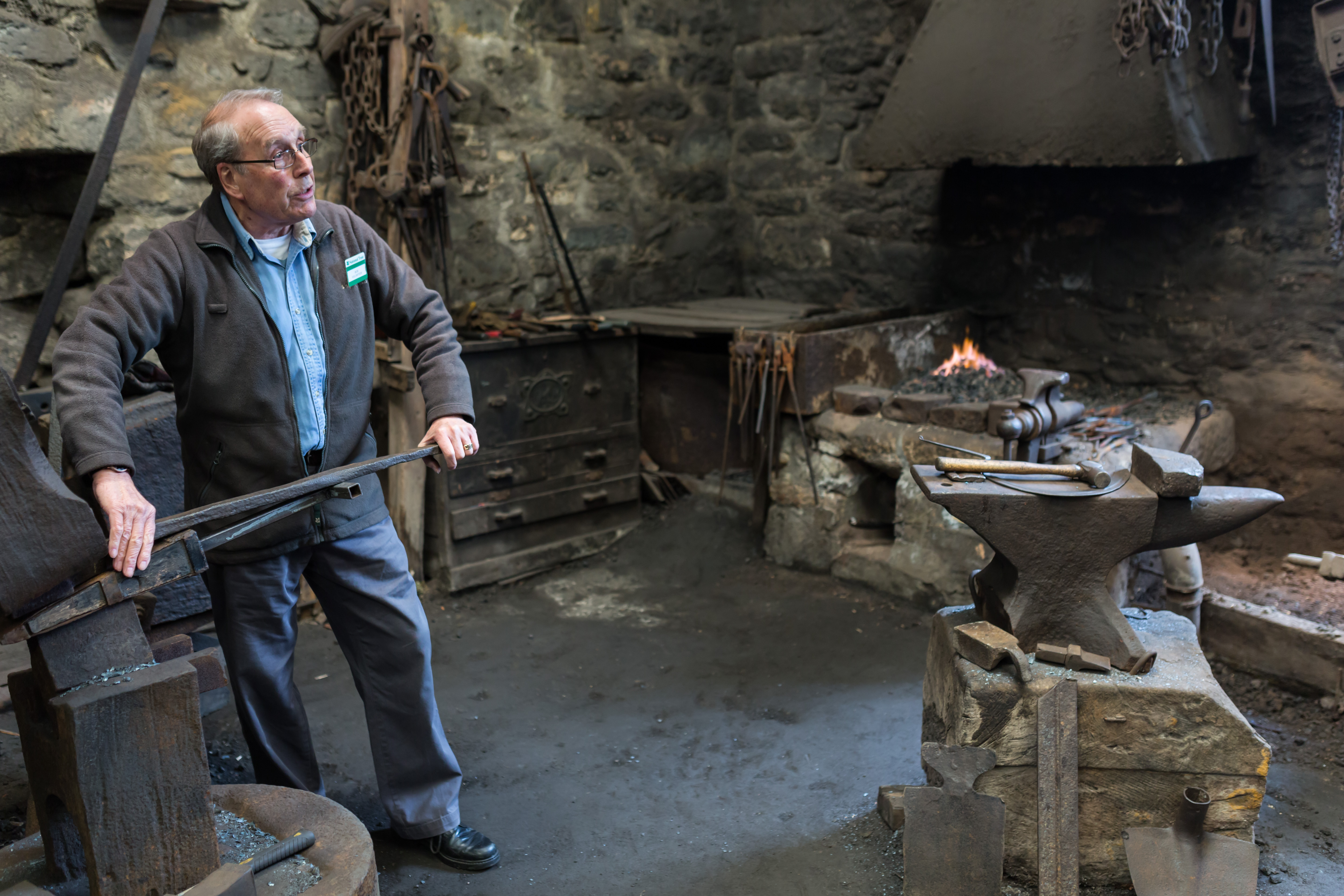
A National Trust volunteer explaining how the foundry operated and was powered

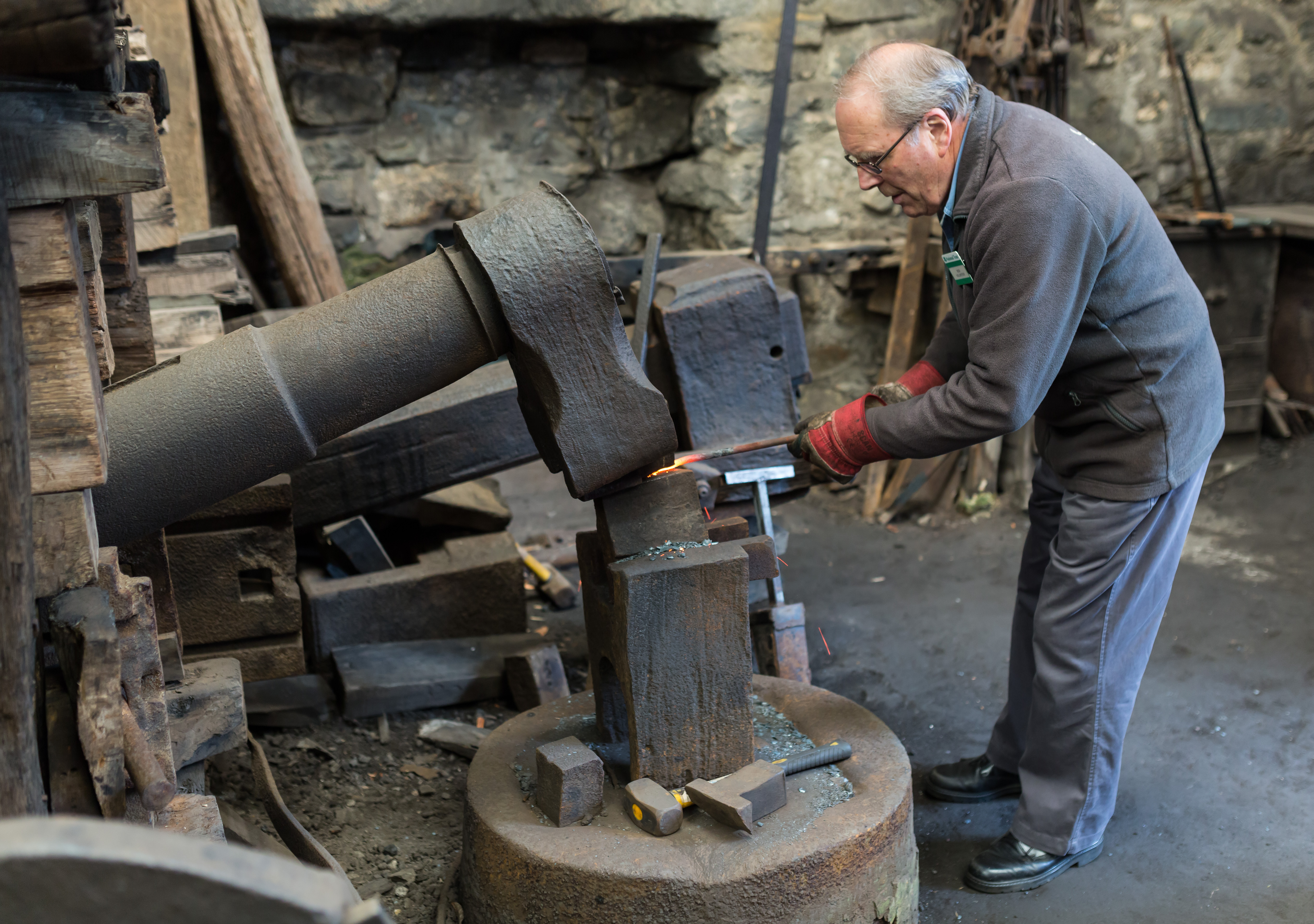
Demonstrating the flattening of a red hot cast iron bar using the tilt hammer

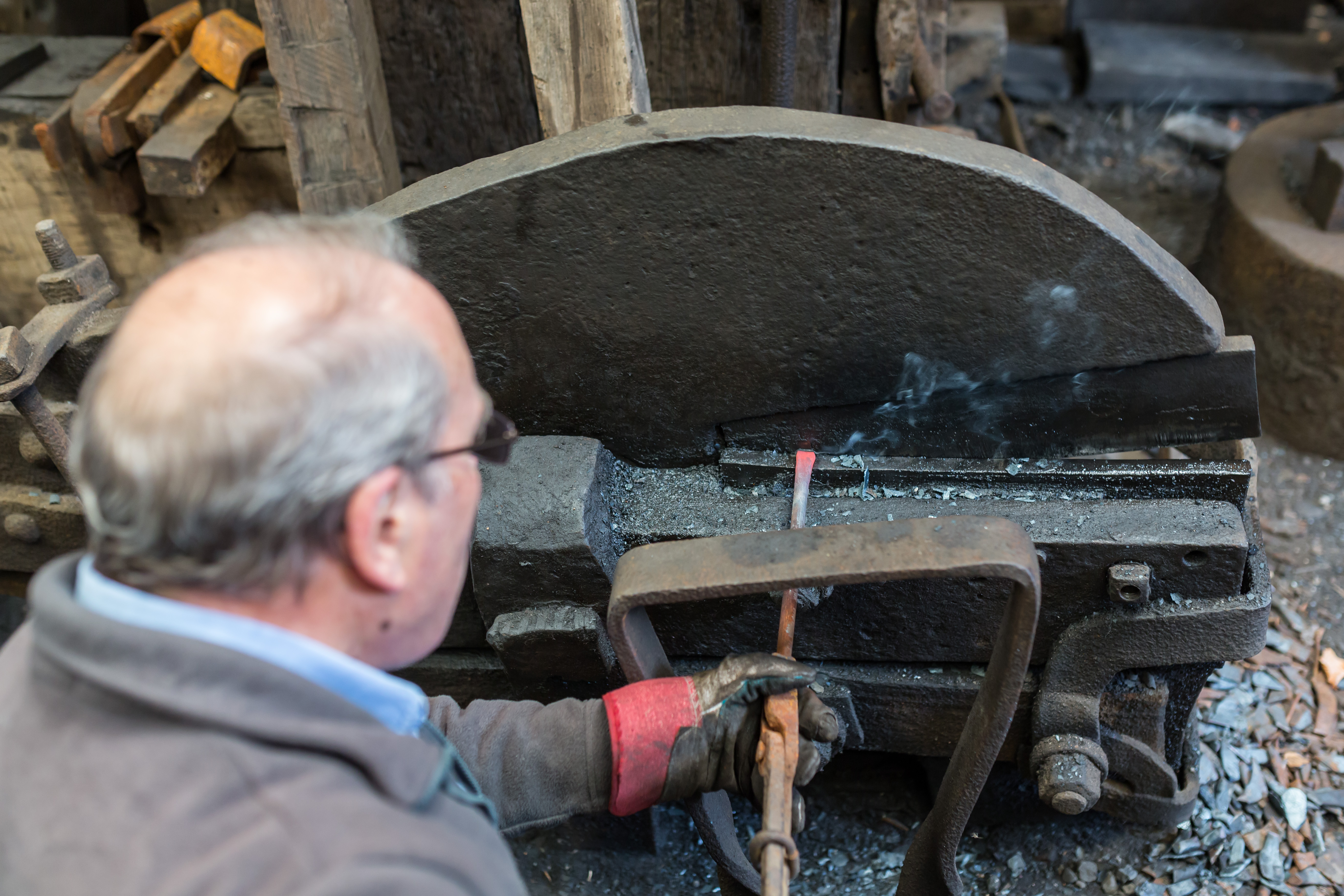
Demonstrating the shear hammer by cutting a segment of red hot cast iron bar which had previously been flattened by the tilt hammer
