= Frohnauer Hammer =

Coordinates: 50°34′54″N 12°59′44″E

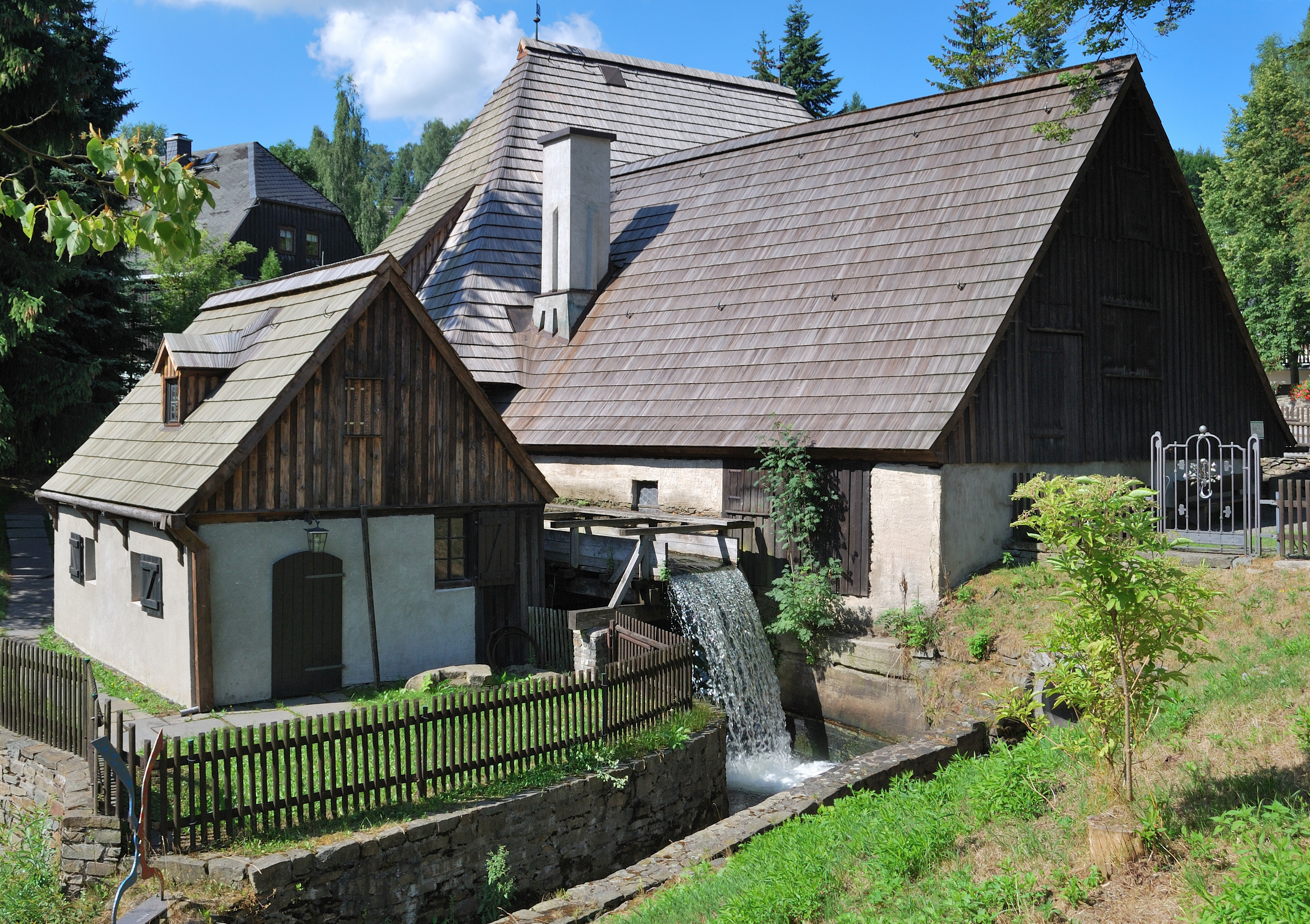
Frohnauer Hammer Technology Museum - exterior view of the smithy

Frohnauer Hammer, Saxony

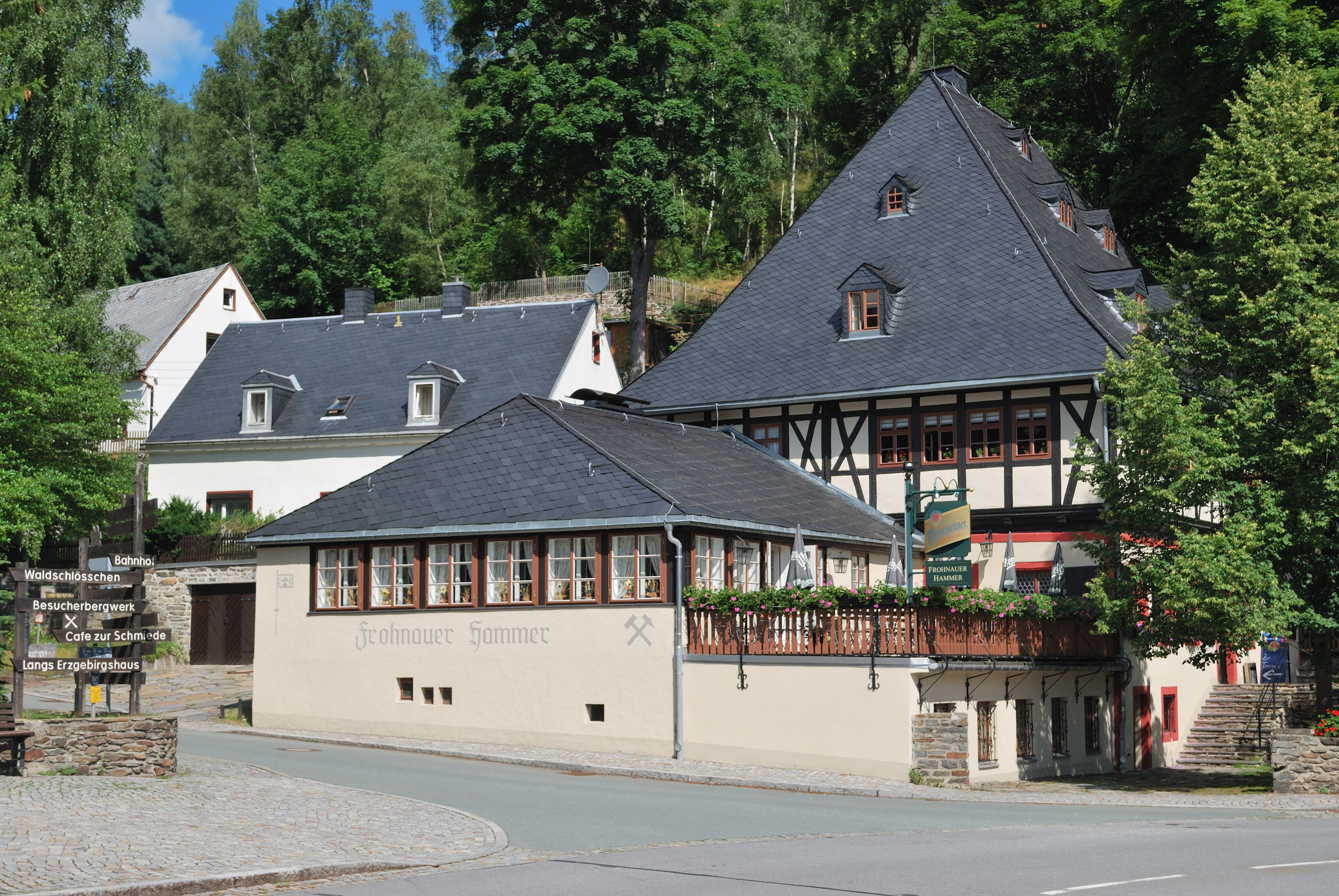
The mansion, today a restaurant. On the upper floor there is a bobbin lace room open to visitors

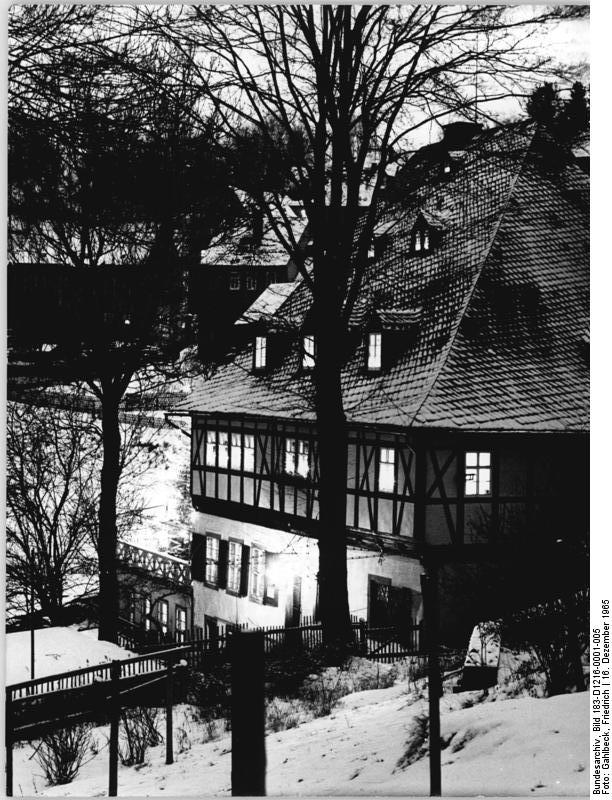
The mansion of the Frohnauer Hammer Mill in 1965

The Frohnauer Hammer is an historic hammer mill in Frohnau, a village in the municipality of Annaberg-Buchholz in the Ore Mountains of southeast Germany. The mill is an important witness to proto-industrial development in the Ore Mountains. Of the once-numerous hammer mills only three others remain working in Saxony: the Dorfchemnitz Iron Hammer Mill, the Grünthal Copper Hammer Mill and the Freibergsdorf Hammer Mill.

In 1907 the Frohnauer Hammer Mill on the Sehma river became the first technical monument in Saxony. The museum complex includes the hammer mill itself, an exhibition of forged artefacts, a hand forge, a mechanical "Christmas hill" (Weihnachtsberg) and a bobbin lace room.

== History ==
The Frohnauer Hammer goes back to the 15th century when it was mentioned as a corn mill with four millstones. On 28 October 1491, Caspar Nietzel discovered a deposit of silver ore on the Schreckenberg mountain, not far from the mill. That same year, mining courts (Berggerichte) were held for the first time in the mill gardens. On 21 September 1496, a decision was made in the rooms of the mill to found the New Town on the Schreckenberg (Neustadt am Schreckenberg), later St. Annaberg. The most notable representative at the meeting of the founding commission in Frohnau was Ulrich Rülein von Calw, the master builder of Annaberg.

In 1498, the young mining town was given minting rights (Münzrecht). The mill was therefore expanded in the same year into a mint, in which the Schreckenberger, a well-known silver coin, was minted. The mint was soon moved to Annaberg in 1502, however. Around 1590, the mill was closed and fell into ruins. In 1611, it became an oil mill, processing flax, with an adjoining scissor grinding works. But by 1616, there were plans to convert the mill into an iron hammer mill. This was not achieved, however, until 1621. Due to the debasement of coins as a consequence of the Thirty Years' War, Prince-Elector John George I took over the mill and had it turned into a silver hammer mill. But this mill only worked for two years and was then closed. It was not worth turning it back into an iron hammer mill, so the prince-elector sold it in 1629 to a scissorsmith. Even its new owner did not have the luck to make it an economic success, the turmoil of war forcing him to give the operation up in 1631. From 1632, the place was used as a copper hammer mill, until its new owner left the business in 1642 probably due to the hardships of the Thirty Years' War that continued to drag on. The building then stood unused for twenty years after its conversion and it was not until 1657 that it came to life again. Its new proprietor, Gottfried Rubner, an Annaberg merchant, had the place converted into an iron hammer mill by 1660 for 740 gulden that made iron strips, armour and shovels in order to satisfy the demand for ironmongery in the economic boom that followed the war.

The iron hammer mill enjoyed its operational heyday in the second half of the 17th century. It developed into an important supplier to the mining industry in the Annaberg region and provided its miners inter alia with hammers and picks and other mining implements. In addition it manufactured agricultural tools and wrought ironwork. Unlike many other iron hammer works in the Ore Mountains, Frohnau did not have its own blast furnace. The pig iron wrought here was supplied by other iron works. On 6 February 1692, the mill was razed to its foundations. Its owner, the smith Johann Klauß, was able to quickly rebuild the facility, however, which suggests it was a thriving business. The rebuild included the representative baroque mansion (Hammerherrenhaus) in timber-framed style (1697). The mill remained operational until 1895, but was only used towards the end as a village smithy. In 1904 it was closed due to a lack of profitability.

Following its closure, local historians and museums strove to preserve the hammer mill because it was one of the few in Germany that had largely retained the original technology of the 17th century. In 1907 the Amtshauptmannschaft Annaberg secured the right to buy the mill. At the same time an association, the Hammerbund was founded, headed by Amtshauptmann von Welck, which attempted to buy the facility. One year later (1908) this association was able to purchase the property and in the years that followed to establish it as the first technical monument in Saxony. In 1910 it was opened to the public as a museum; the guest house was also opened that year. Seventeen years later (1925) the three tilt hammers were brought back into action. In 1938, ownership of the mill changed to the Heimatwerks Sachsen. After the end of the Second World War the site was taken over by the Saxon state government, but further measures to protect the monument had to be cancelled due to a lack of finance. As a result, the firm of SDAG Wismut bought the building and used it as a store and canteen for research mine shaft No. 132 located nearby.

Following the closure of Wismut's business, there were frequent changes of owner including the Dresden University of Technology, the Saxon State Government and the city council of Karl Marx Stadt. Management was delegated by the provincial government to the Cultural Department of the Annaberg district council. In 1952, the government of East Germany allocated 100,000 marks for safety measures and just under 20,000 marks annually for the preservation of the mill. In 1953, the Frohnauer Hammer was re-opened as a museum. Within the next seven years the facility received a million visitors. In 1985 the five millionth visitor was greeted. Today it has hosted around 7.6 million visitors.

== Technology ==
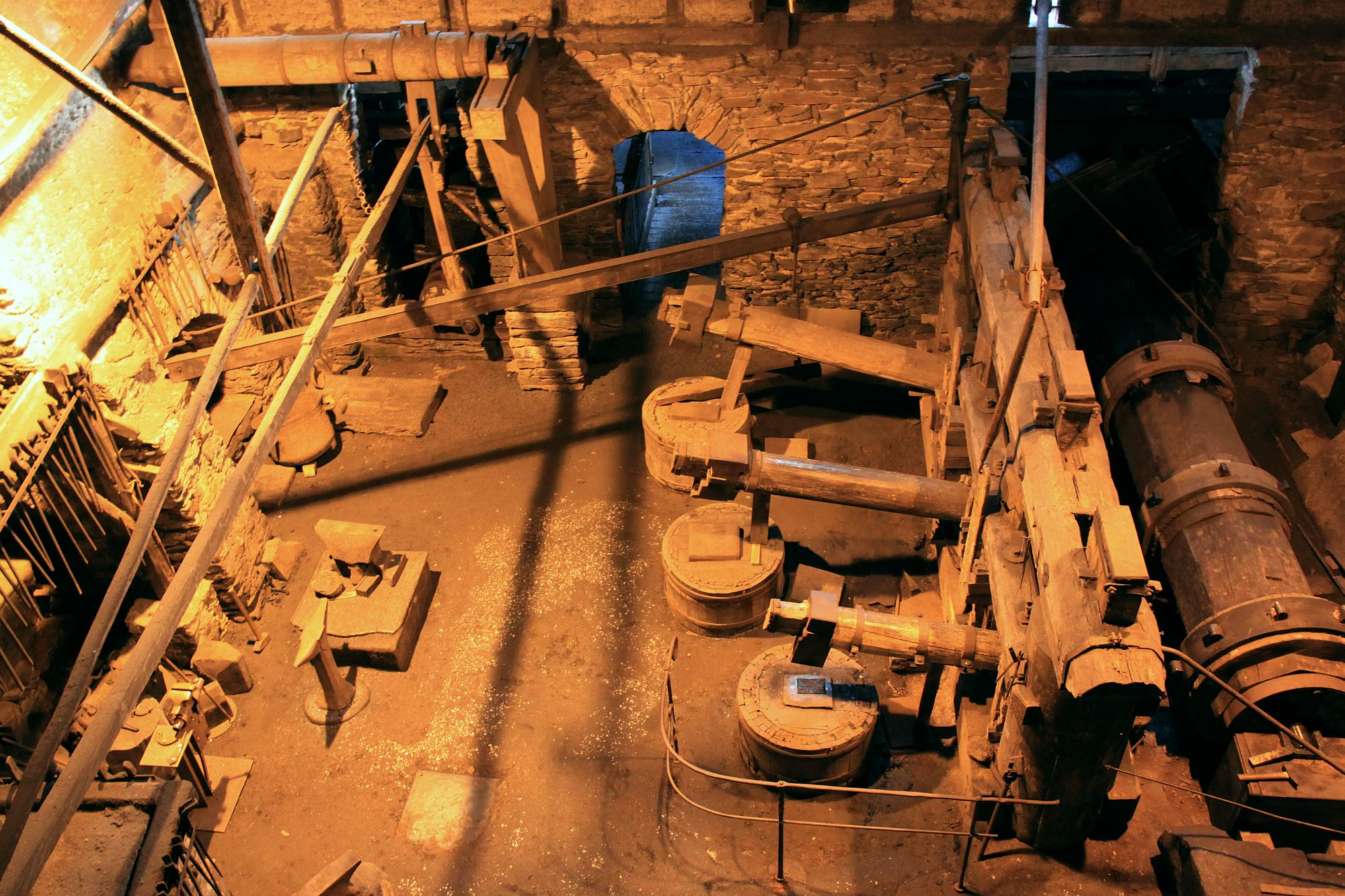
Interior of the smithy

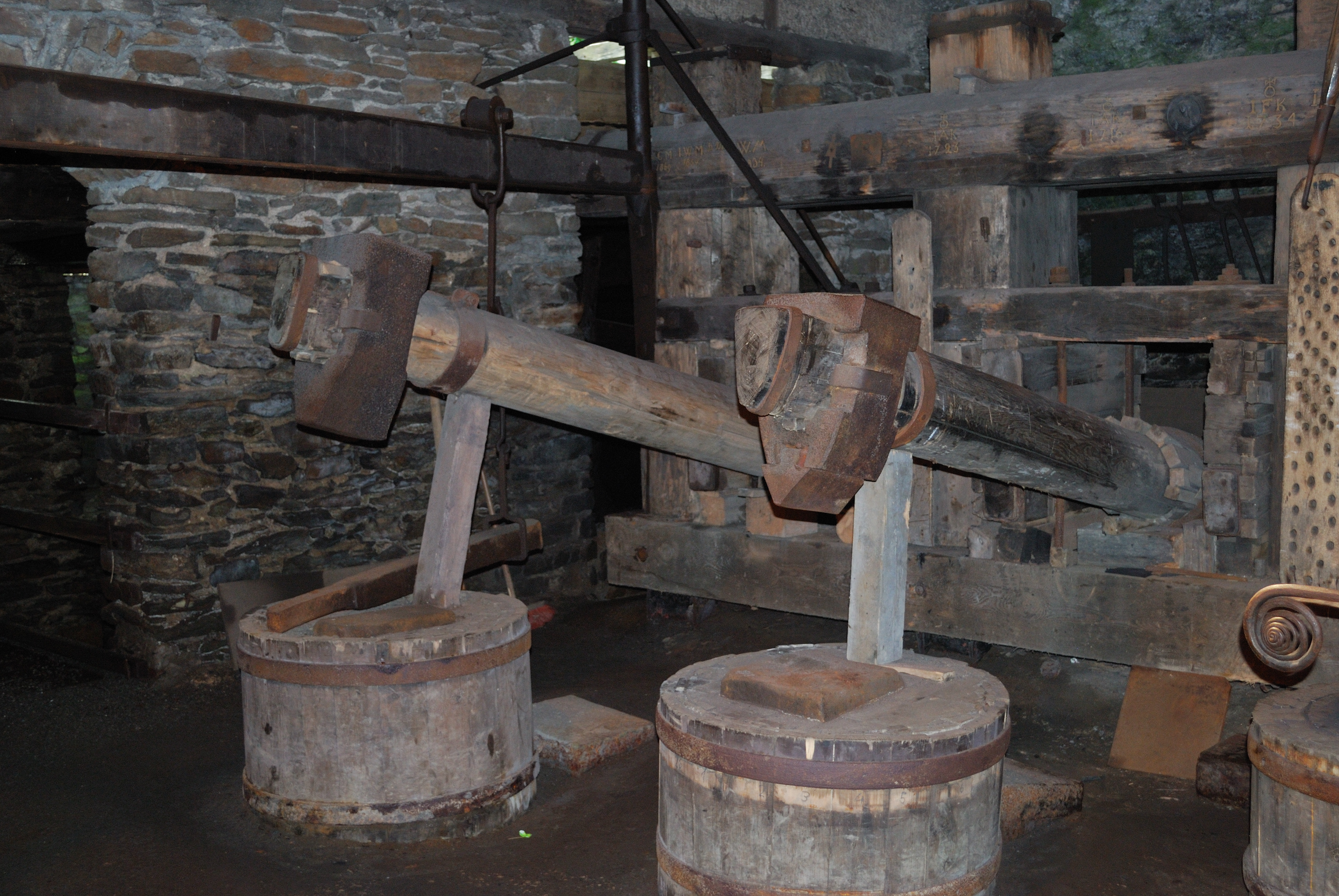
The hammers

The Frohnauer Hammer still has the original hammer mill technology from the second half of the 17th century. The heart of this system is the three tilt hammers, whose shafts are driven by an overshot water wheel. The hammers themselves have a weight of 100 kg, 200 kg and 250 kg (220 lb, 440 lb, and 550 lb respectively). They can develop a hammer force of up to 12 tons. Nowadays, during demonstrations, only the small hammer is operated. The bellows system has also been preserved. A water-driven, manual lathe and a drill spindle may be viewed in an outbuilding.

=== Drop hammer ===
In addition, there is an open-die steam drop hammer on display in one of the exhibition rooms. These steam hammers replaced the water-powered hammers from 1860 onwards.

Technical data:

- Built 1918
- Manufacturer: Richard Hartmann, Chemnitz
- Total weight without anvil block: 7 tonnes (15,000 lb)
- Drop weight of the hammer tup: 600 kiloponds (5,900 N; 1,300 lbf)
- Maximum stroke of the hammer tup: 80 centimetres (31 in)
- No. of blows per minute: up to 105

The hammer was used until 1983 in the VEB stamping and forging works unit in Brand-Erbisdorf.

== Sources ==
- Waldemar Berger: Der Frohnauer Hammer. Ein Kulturdenkmal des oberen Erzgebirges. Buchholz 1925.
- Jörg Bräuer: Technisches Denkmal und Museum Frohnauer Hammer. Reihe Sächsische Museen kleine Reihe Nr. 5. Chemnitz 2002.
- Siegfried Sieber: Der Frohnauer Hammer als Denkmal der erzgebirgischen Eisenindustrie. in: Mitteilungen des Landesvereins Sächsischer Heimatschutz. Band XXVII. Heft 1–4. Dresden 1938. S. 1-29.
- Dokumente zur Geschichte des Frohnauer Hammers, Heftreihe, Teil 1 - 10, Herausgeber: Technisches Museum Frohnauer Hammer und Hammerbund Frohnau e.V., 2007
- Bernd Schreiter: 100 Jahre Hammerbund 1907 – 2007, Festgabe zum Jubiläum, Herausgeber: Hammerbund Frohnau e.V., 2007
