= Frohnau (Annaberg-Buchholz) =

- Stadtteil of Annaberg-Buchholz
- Interactive map of Frohnau
- Location within Germany Location within Saxony
- Coordinates: 50°34′52.981034″N 12°59′20.765076″E
- Country: Germany
- State: Saxony
- District: Erzgebirgskreis
- Town: Annaberg-Buchholz

Population (2011)
  - Total: 924
- Time zone: UTC+01:00 (CET)
  - Summer (DST): UTC+02:00 (CEST)
- Postal codes: 09456
- Dialling codes: 03733

Frohnau is a village in the Saxon town of Annaberg-Buchholz in the district of Erzgebirgskreis in southeast Germany. The discovery of silver on the Schreckenberg led in 1496 to the foundation of the neighbouring mining town of Annaberg. The village of Frohnau is best known for its museum of technology, the Frohnauer Hammer, and the visitor mine of Markus Röhling Stolln. The mining area around Frohnau has been selected as a candidate for a UNESCO World Heritage Site: the Ore Mountain Mining Region (Montanregion Erzgebirge).

== Geography ==
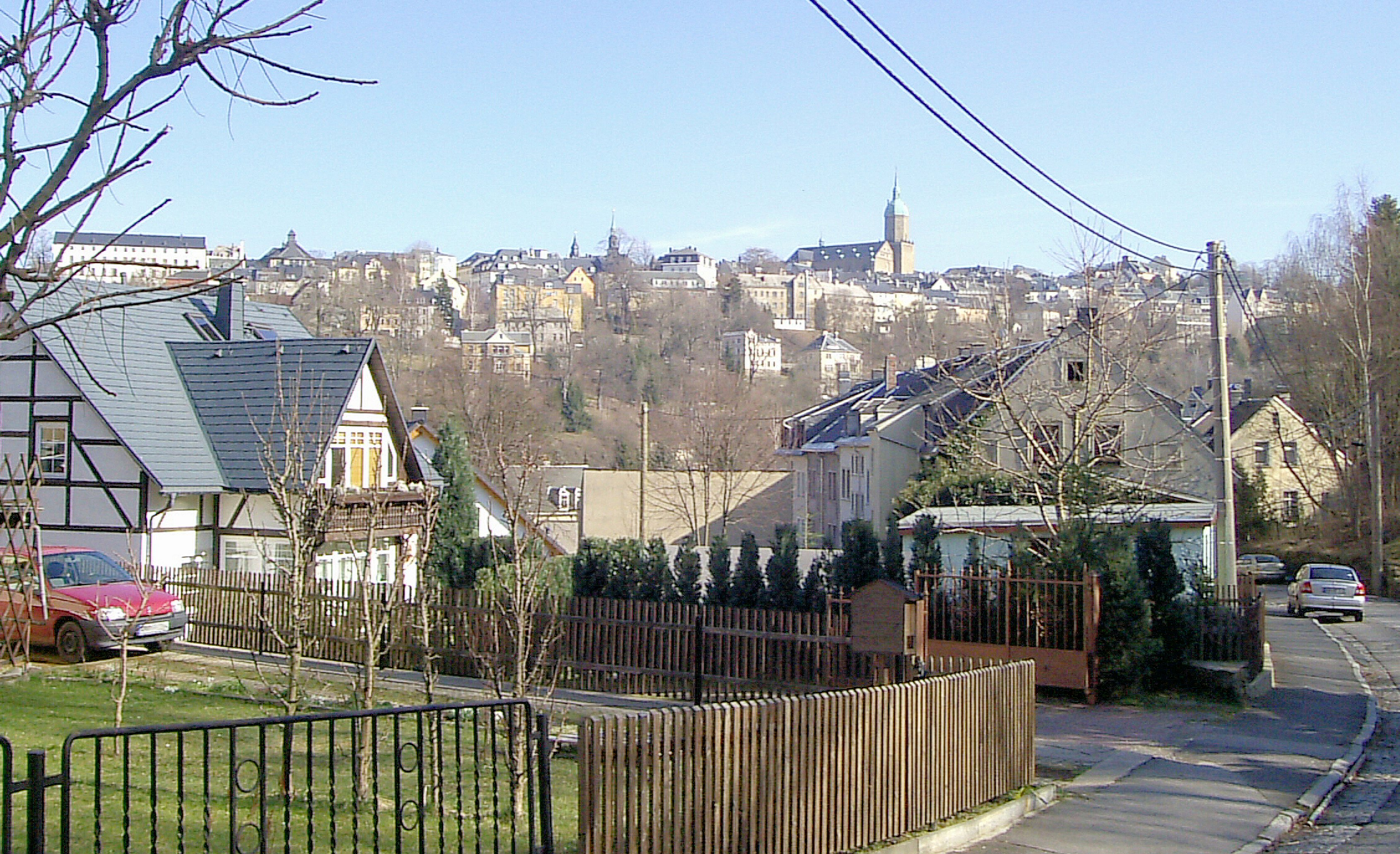
View from the village of Frohnau towards Annaberg

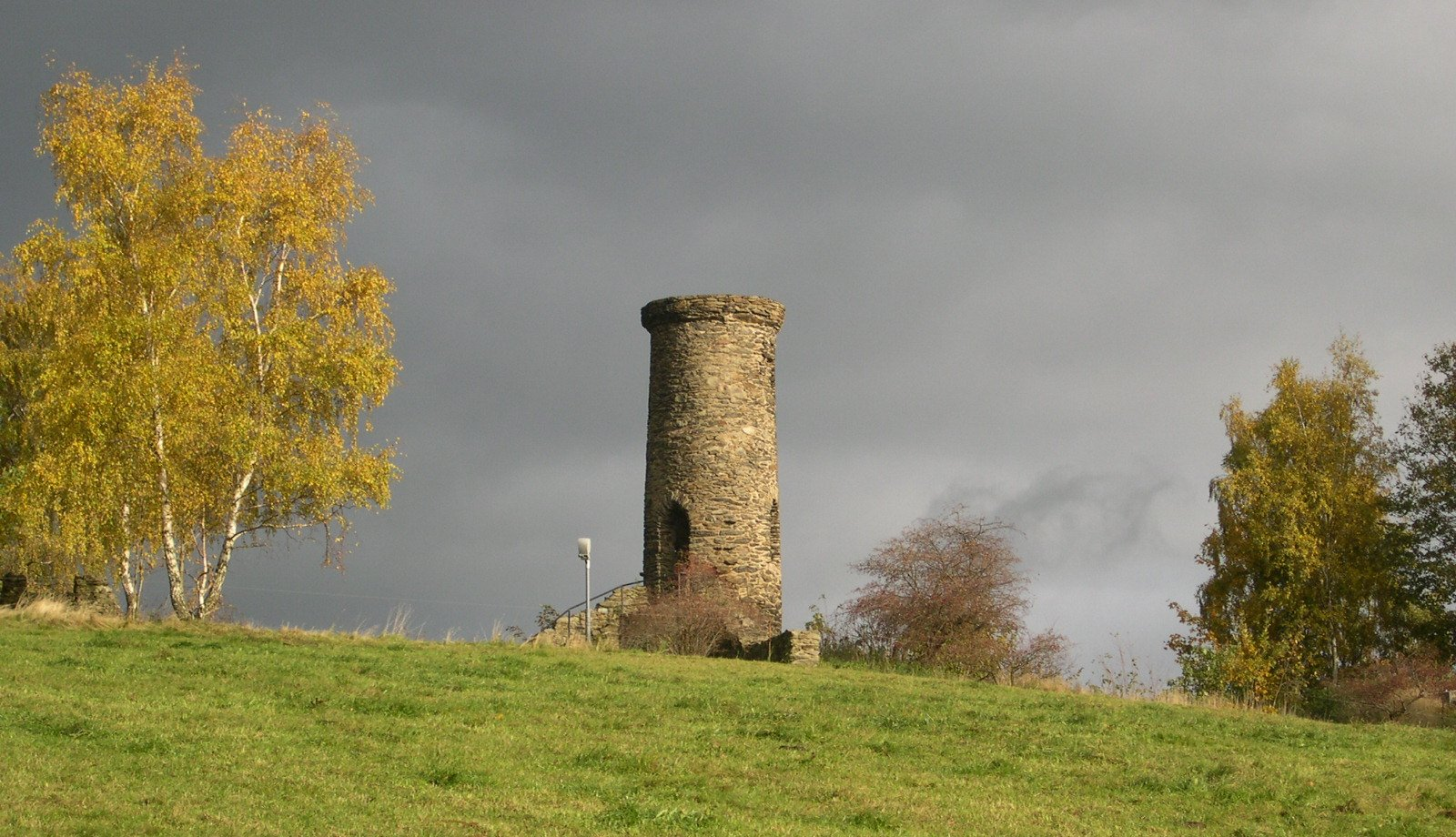
View of the Schreckenberg ruins

The Waldhufendorf of Frohnau is located about a kilometre west of the town centre of Annaberg. The lower part of the village is located in the valley of the Sehma river on the Staatsstraße S261. The village runs along a steep village street in a western direction up to the heights of the Schreckenberg.

== History ==
From 1952 to 1990, Frohnau was part of the Bezirk Karl-Marx-Stadt of East Germany.

== Sources ==
- Schumann, August (1816). "Frohnau". Vollständiges Staats-, Post- und Zeitungslexikon von Sachsen (in German). Vol. 3. Zwickau. p. 11.
- Lothar Klapper: 600 Jahre Frohnau. Streifzüge durch Geschichte des oberen Erzgebirges, Heft 8, 1997
- Lothar Klapper: Die Frohnauer Schule im Wandel der Zeiten. Streifzüge durch Geschichte des oberen Erzgebirges, Heft 76, 2009
