= Freibergsdorf Hammer Mill =

Museum in Germany

Coordinates: 50°54′37″N 13°19′37″E

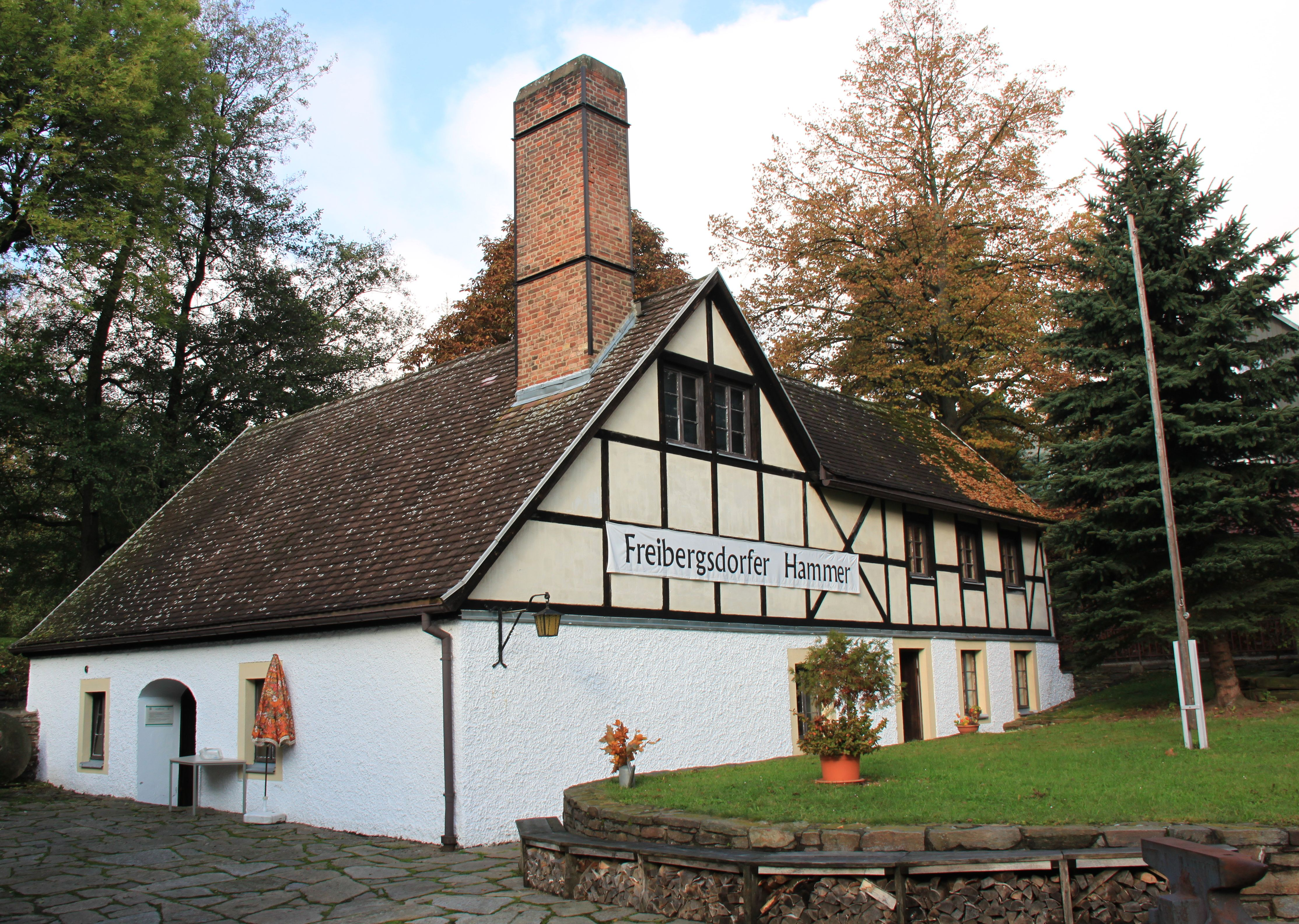
The Freibergsdorf Hammer Mill

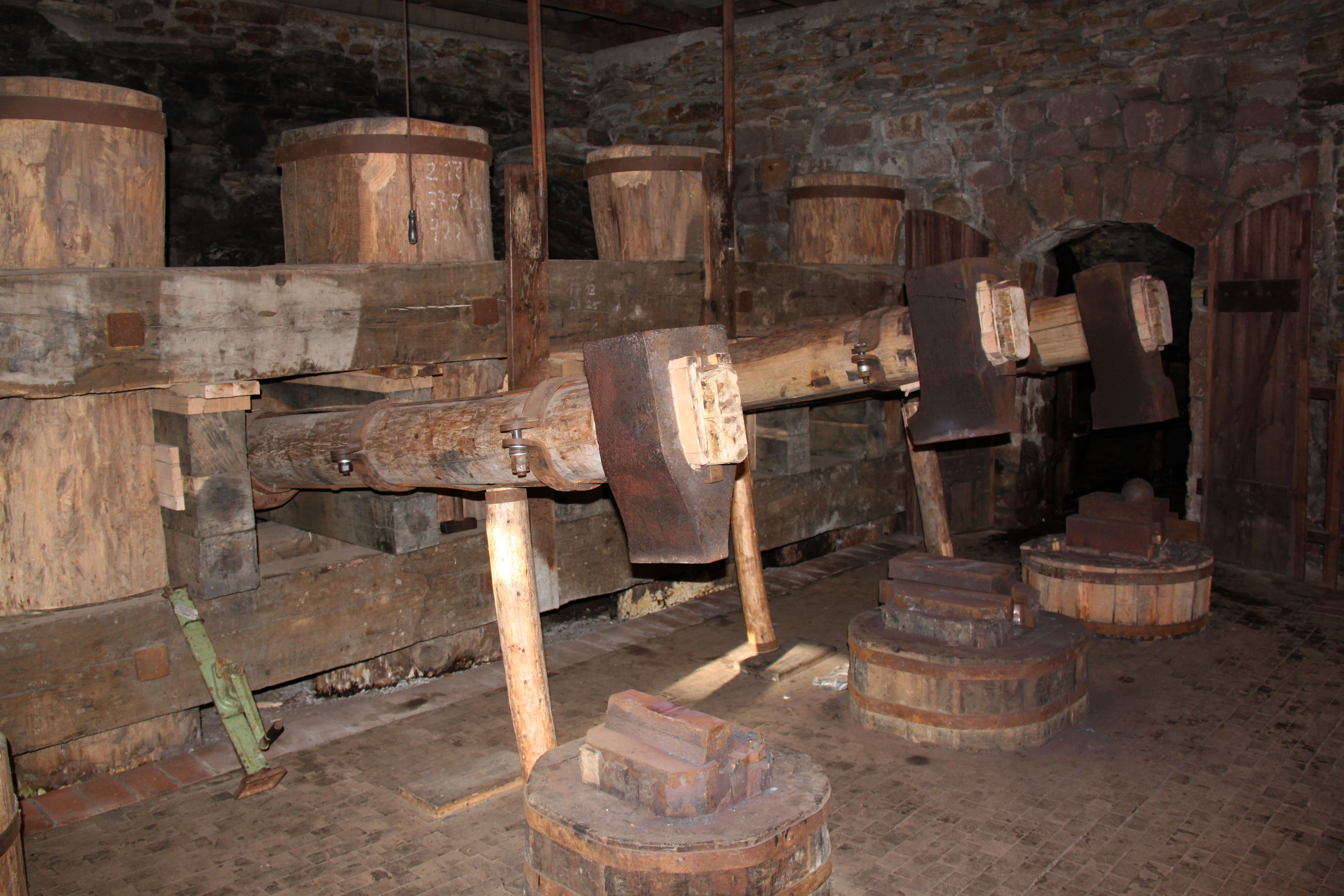
Hammer system with the three tilt hammers

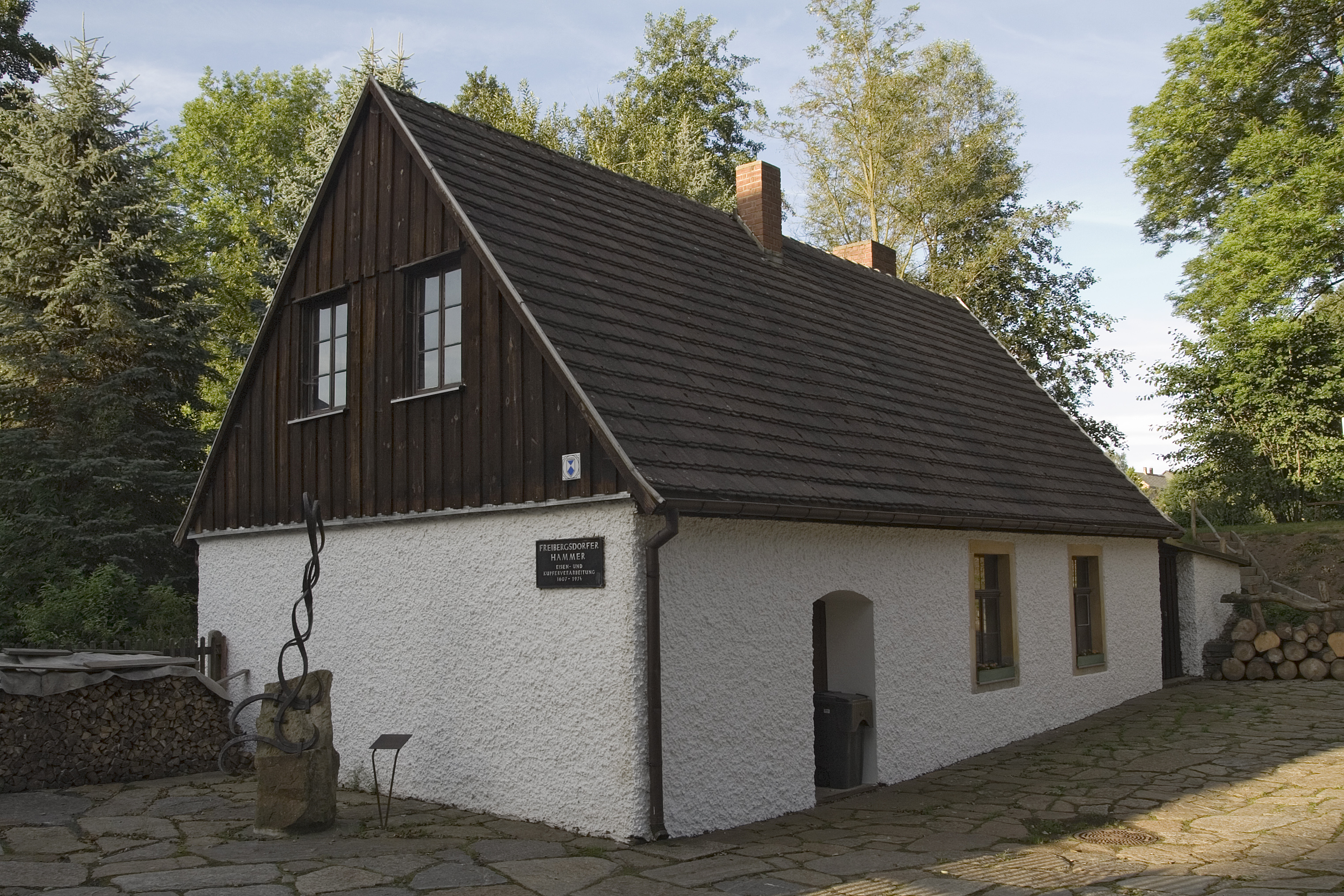
Outbuilding

The Freibergsdorf Hammer Mill (German: Freibergsdorfer Hammer) is an old hammer works that was used for metalworking in the village of Freibergsdorf in the German Ore Mountains. The site represents an important witness to proto-industrial development in the Ore Mountains. Of the once-numerous hammer mills, only three others remain working in Saxony: the Frohnauer Hammer, the Dorfchemnitz Iron Hammer Mill, and the Grünthal Copper Hammer Mill.

The Freibergsdorf Hammer Mill is the only surviving iron hammer mill in the Freiberg Mining Region. It was also the last hammer mill in production in Saxony.

== History ==
The first record of the hammer mill dates to the year 1607, when the owner of the demesne in Freibergsdorf, Ernst Schönlebe, was granted water for his (iron) bar mill or Zainhammer. On several occasions, the water of the Goldbach was the subject of dispute between the Freiberg Mine, the hammer mill and a neighbouring mill. Over the course of the centuries, the hammer works primarily manufactured iron products both for the mining industry (e. g. tools like hammers, chisels, crow bars) as well as implements for agricultural use. Until its sale to St. John's Hospital in 1903, the hammer mill had been privately owned. Between 1903 and 1945 it made copper products almost exclusively. Commercial operations were finally ended in 1974.

Between 1979 and 1989 the Freibergsdorf Hammer Mill was reconstructed. For example, safety measures to the roof timbers, the water wheels, hammer axle and structure, the rubble stone walls and water chests were carried out. The hammer mill was opened to the public in 1991, but may only be visited by appointment or as part of events such as the German Mill Day (Deutscher Mühlentag) or the Day of Traditional Crafts (Tag des traditionellen Handwerks). It is looked after by the Freibergsdorf Hammer Mill Society (Freibergsdorfer Hammerverein e. V.).

== Technology ==
The hammer equipment has been kept fully operational. From the hammer mill pond above the mill a hammer mill channel or ditch leads water to the wooden overshot wheel with a diameter of almost four metres. The octagonal driving shaft is made of oak; it has a weight of about 7 tonnes (15,000 lb) and a length of 9.5 metres (31 ft). Three tilt hammers with heads weighing 250, 200 and 100 kg (550, 440, and 220 lb respectively) are operated by iron tappets on the driving shaft.

== Sources ==
- Eberhard Löffler: Zur Geschichte und Rekonstruktion des Freibergsdorfer Hammerwerkes. In: Sächsische Heimatblätter. 30(1984)6, pp. 241–246
- Karl Kutzschke: Das Hammerwerk von Freibergsdorf. Rekonstruktion eines technischen Denkmals. In: Erzgebirgische Heimatblätter, Heft 4/1986, pp. 99–102
- Eberhard Löffler, Karl Kutzschke, Johannes Seidel: Das Freibergsdorfer Hammerwerk. In: Schriftenreihe Stadt- und Bergbaumuseum Freiberg 9(1990), pp. 42–75
- Freibergsdorfer Hammerverein e.V. (Hrsg.): 400 Jahre Freibergsdorfer Hammer. Freiberg, 2007
