= Eisenhammer Dorfchemnitz =

Historic hammer mill

Coordinates: 50°46′15″N 13°25′50″E

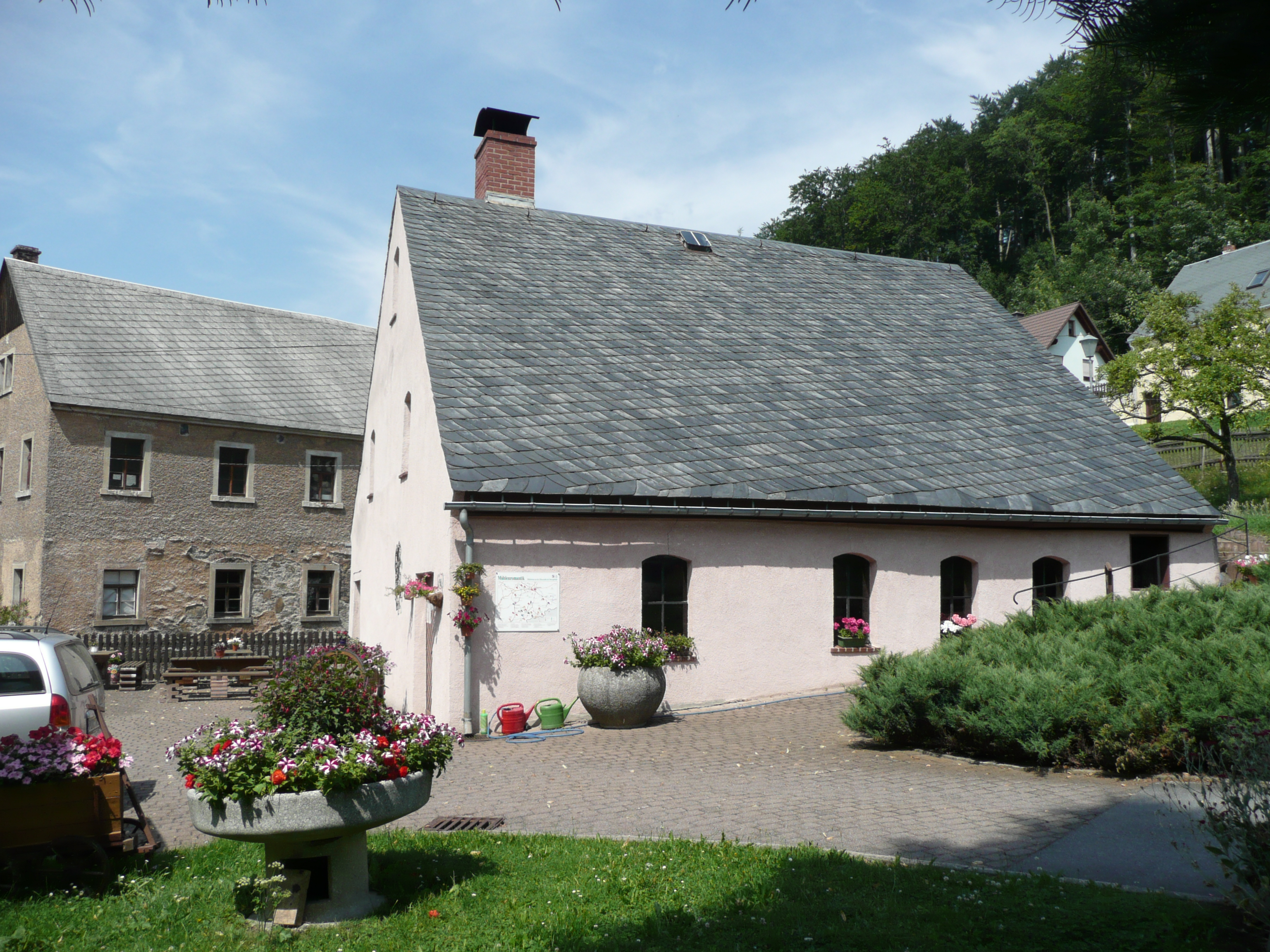
Eisenhammer Dorfchemnitz (2008)

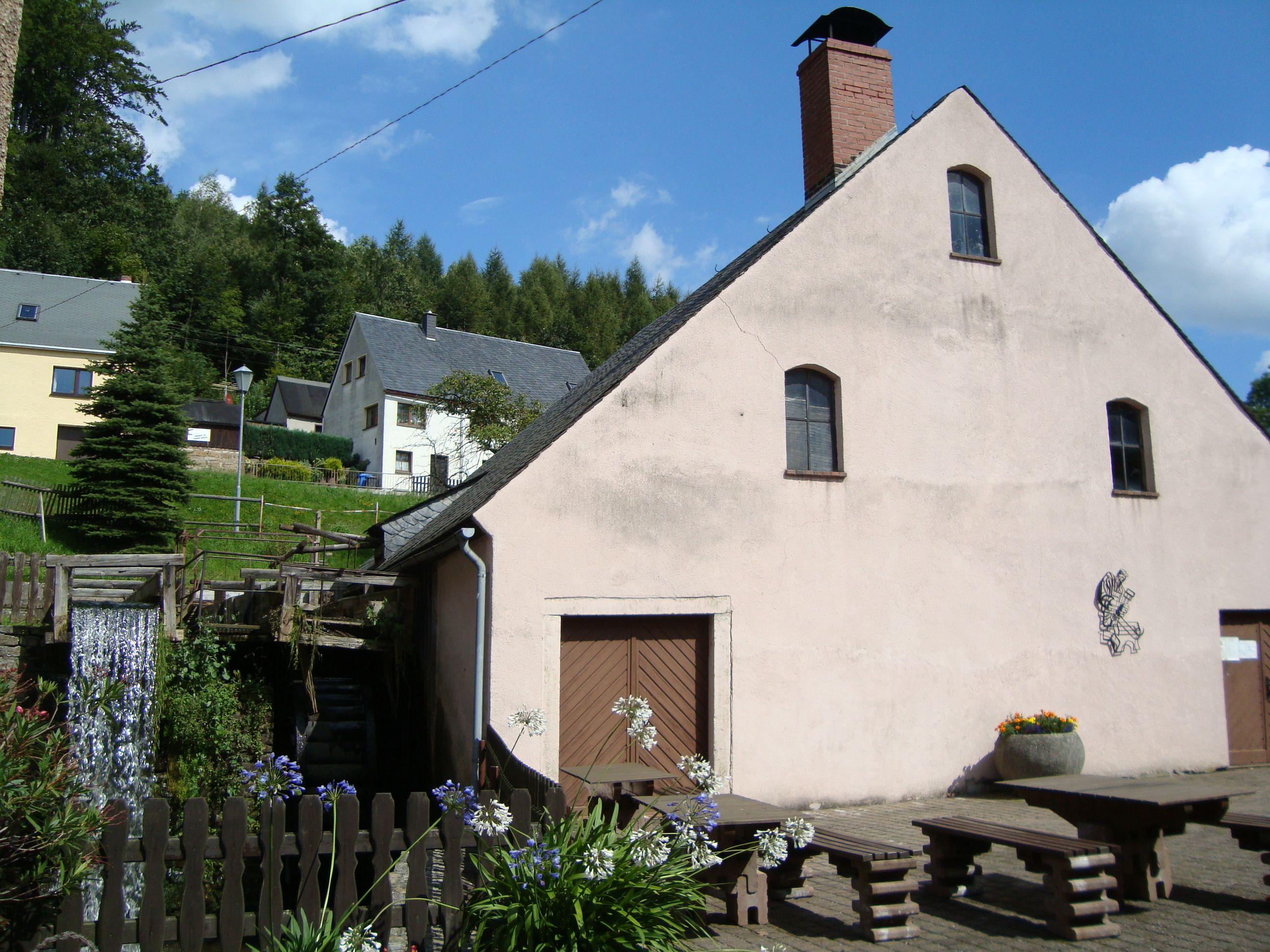
Eisenhammer Dorfchemnitz and its water wheel (2010)

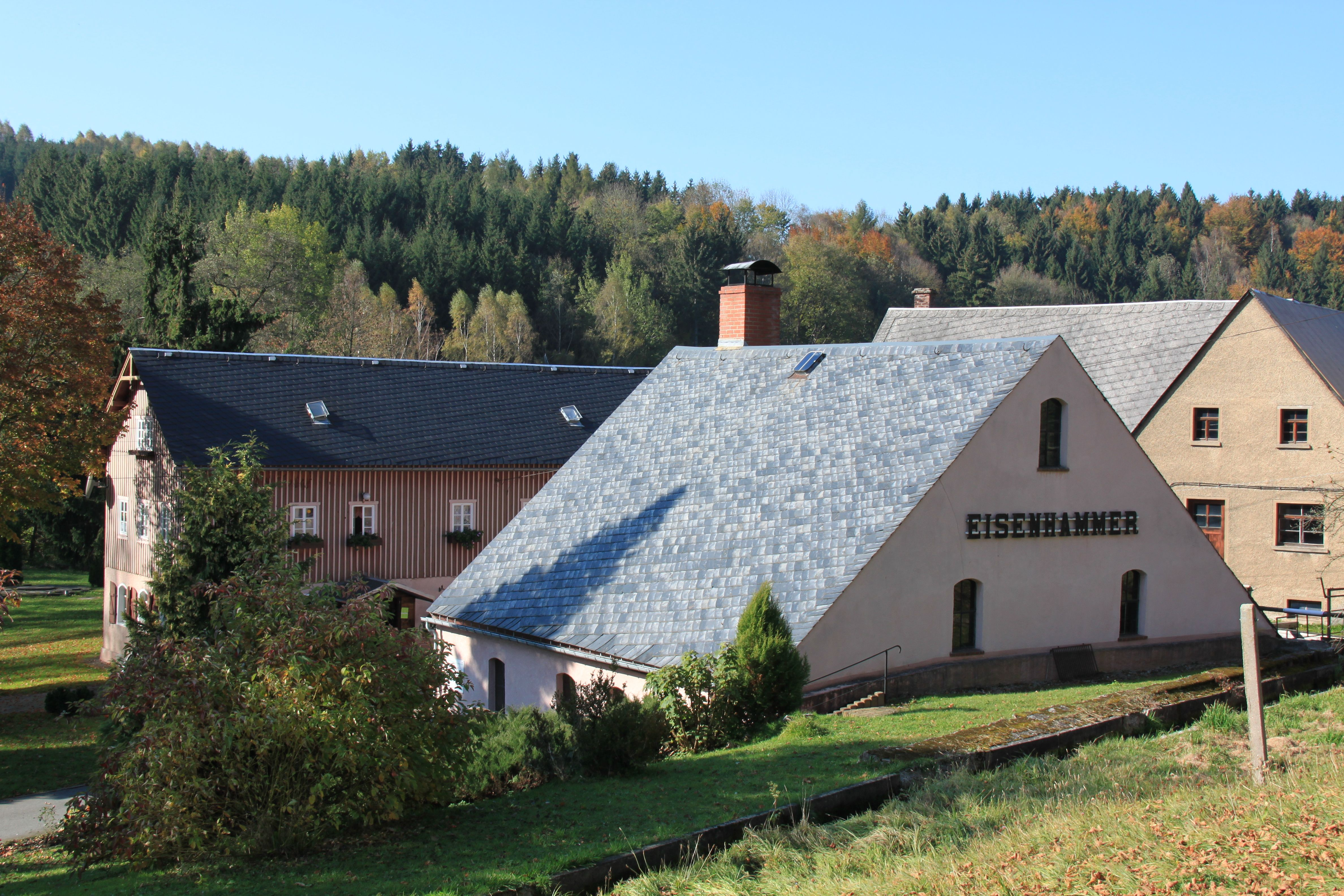
Overview of the building complex. Foreground the hammer mill channel

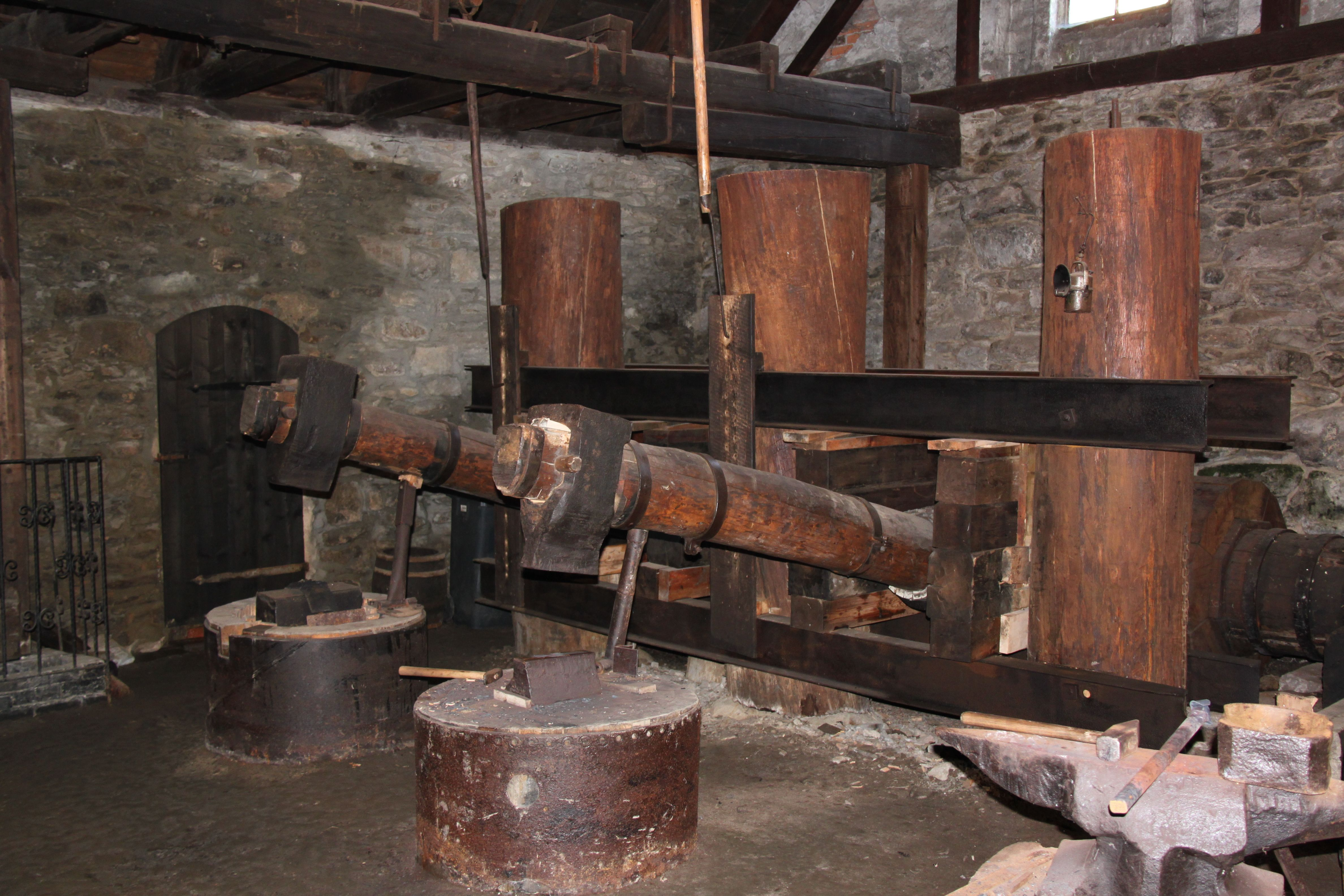
Hammer equipment with both tilt hammers

Eisenhammer Dorfchemnitz is an historic hammer mill in Dorfchemnitz in the Ore Mountains of Germany. The mill is an important witness to proto-industrial development in the Ore Mountains. Of the once-numerous hammer mills only three others remain working in Saxony apart from the Frohnauer Hammer: the Frohnauer Hammer Mill, the Grünthal Copper Hammer Mill and the Freibergsdorf Hammer Mill.

The mill, which is situated on the Chemnitzbach stream, has been a technology museum since 1969 which, in addition to the actual hammer mill, also has a local history room.

== Sources ==
- Franz Eisel: Sachsens Museen & Schauanlagen des Berg- und Hüttenwesens. Husum Druck- und Verlagsgesellschaft, Husum 2007, ISBN 978-3-89876-326-4
- Benno Reichel: Die Entwicklung des Hammerwerkes Dorfchemnitz im Kreis Brand-Erbisdorf. in: Sächsische Heimatblätter, Heft 6/1958, S. 354–362
- Wolfgang Schmidt, Wilfried Theile: Denkmale der Produktions- und Verkehrsgeschichte. Teil 1. VEB Verlag für Bauwesen, Berlin 1989, ISBN 3-345-00312-0
- Rudolf Schumann: Der Eisenhammer zu Dorfchemnitz und die Ölmühle zu Friedebach. Zwei alte Arbeitsstätten im östlichen Erzgebirge. in: Mitteilungen des Landesvereins Sächsischer Heimatschutz, Bd. XXIX, Heft 1-4/1940, Dresden 1940, S. 43–53
