= Sehma (river) =

River in Germany

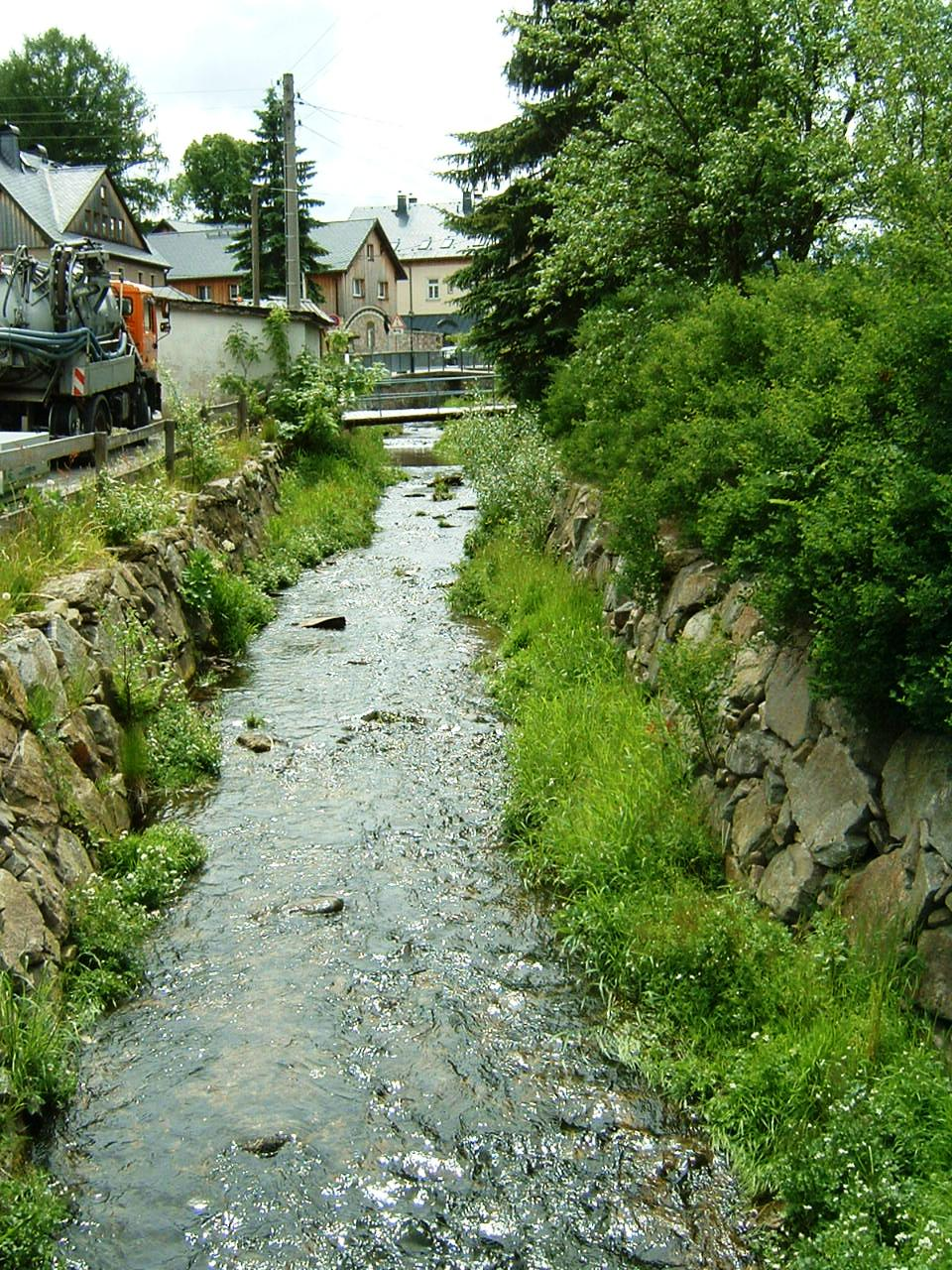

Location
- Country: Germany
- State: Saxony

Physical characteristics
- Source
  - location: Source: near Neudorf
  - coordinates: 50°28′05″N 12°58′18″E
  - elevation: ca. 720 m above sea level (NHN)
- Mouth
  - location: near Wiesa into the Zschopau
  - coordinates: 50°36′17″N 12°59′35″E
  - elevation: 464.5 m above sea level (NHN)

Basin features
- Progression: Zschopau→ Freiberger Mulde→ Mulde→ Elbe→ North Sea
- River system: Elbe

The Sehma is a right tributary of the river Zschopau in the German federal state of Saxony and begins at the confluence of its headstreams the White Sehma (Weiße Sehma) and Red Sehma (Rote Sehma).

- The White Sehma rises in the Ore Mountains on the Fichtelberg (1,214 m) and flows northwards, parallel to the Zschopau.
- Above Neudorf it merges with the Red Sehma coming from Kretscham-Rothensehma (a district of Sehmatal), which enters from the right and itself begins at the confluence of the Lampertsbach and Stümpelbach streams a few kilometres earlier.

In the valley of the combined Sehma are the long, narrow villages of Neudorf, Cranzahl and Sehma which belong to the municipality of Sehmatal. The Sehma continues to the merged town of Annaberg-Buchholz where it divides Buchholz in the west from Annaberg in the east, the two quarters having been independent towns until 1945. The Sehma valley is also home to the village of Frohnau and its well-known hammer mill, the Frohnauer Hammer. Above Wiesa the Sehma discharges into the Zschopau.

== See also ==
- List of rivers of Saxony
