= Auma (disambiguation) =

Auma is a town and a former municipality in Thuringia, Germany, today part of Auma-Weidatal.

Auma may also refer to:

- AUMA, Adult Use of Marijuana Act, a 2016 voter initiative in California
- Auma (river), of Thuringia, Germany
- Auma, American Samoa, a village on Tutuila Island
- Auma (surname)

Given name:

- Rita Auma Obama, Kenyan-British activist
