= Bavarian Iron Route =

Southern German holiday route

The Bavarian Iron Route or, less commonly, Bavarian Iron Road (German: Bayerische Eisenstraße) is a major holiday route in southern Germany which is steeped in history. Running for 120 kilometres, it links numerous historic industrial sites, covering a period of several centuries, with cultural and natural monuments.

The project is part of the Central European Iron Route, whose organisation is coordinated by the Mining History Association of Austria ( Montanhistorischer Verein Österreich) with its head office in Leoben. In the working group are representatives from Germany, Austria, Hungary, Slovakia, Poland, Rumania, Slovenia and Italy. This project was recognised by the Council of Europe as the cultural route for the iron industry in Europe.

The Bavarian Iron Route runs southwards along old transport routes from the Upper Franconian town of Pegnitz through the Upper Palatinate to Regensburg and links the former iron centres of East Bavaria, the mining regions of Pegnitz, Auerbach, Edelsfeld, Sulzbach-Rosenberg and Amberg. From there it continues for about 60 kilometres on a waterway on the rivers Vils and Naab to their confluence with the Danube near Regensburg.

== Literature ==
- B.Kaulich, R.Meyer, H.Schmidt-Kaler: Von Nürnberg durch die Pegnitz-Alb zur Bayerischen Eisenstraße, Walks into the Earth's History, Vol. 11 (with map and 8 excursions), Verlag Pfeil, Munich, 2000.
