= Riess (company) =

Austrian metalworking business

- Native name: Riess Kelomat GmbH
- Industry: Metalworking
- Founded: 1550
- Headquarters: Maisberg 47, A-3341 Ybbsitz, Austria
- Number of employees: about 140
- Website: www.riess.at

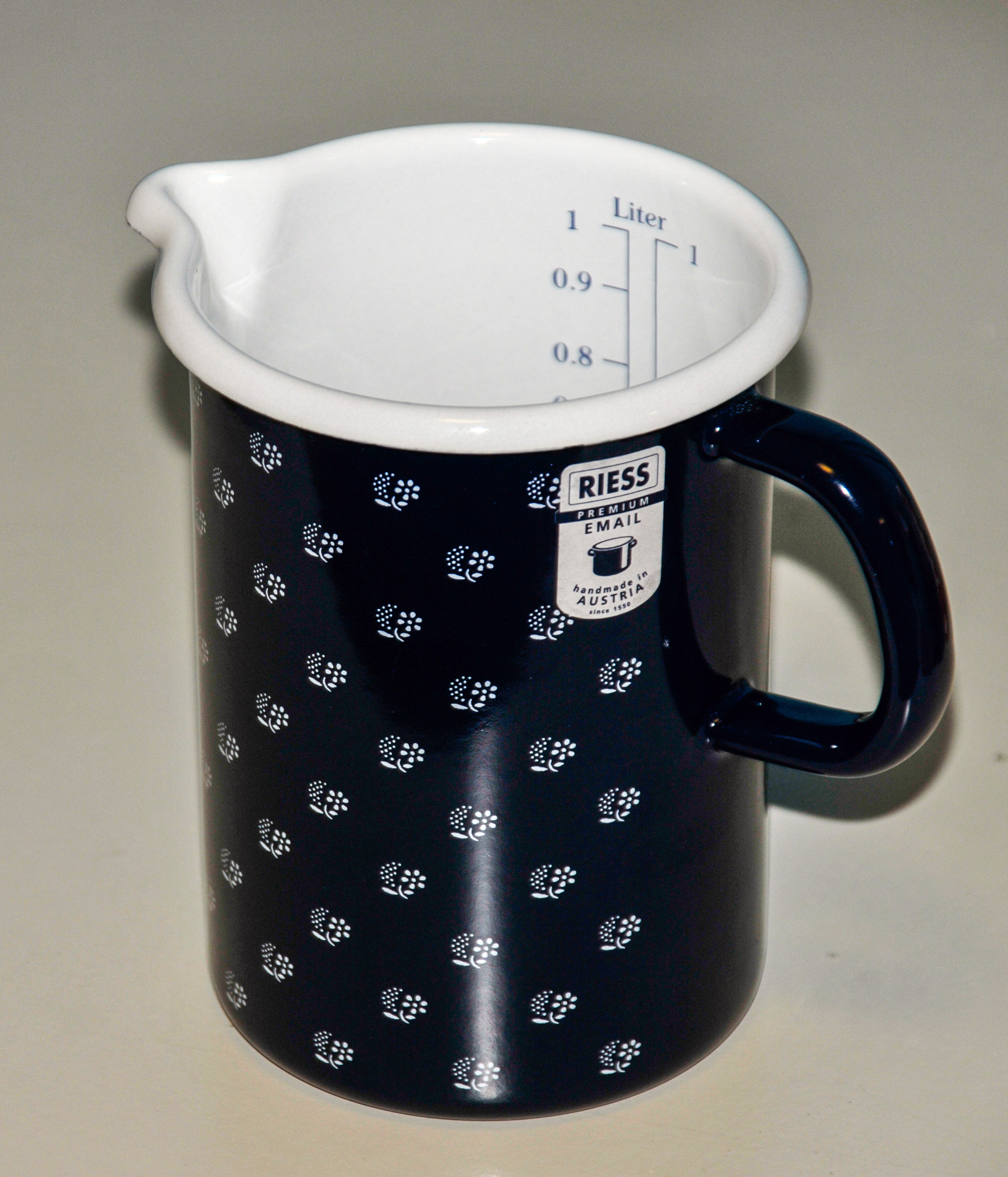
Enamel measuring cup by the Riess company

Riess Kelomat GmbH is a metalworking Austrian family business founded in 1550 and located in Ybbsitz, Amstetten District, Lower Austria. The company has been family-owned since 1690; Johann Riess, from whom the company takes its name, joined the business in 1801 through marriage. In 1922, the company began enamelling cookware at their plant.

As of 2022, Riess was the only one of five tableware manufacturers remaining in Austria, and employed 140 people.

== See also ==
- List of oldest companies
