= Noviny pod Ralskem =

- Municipality
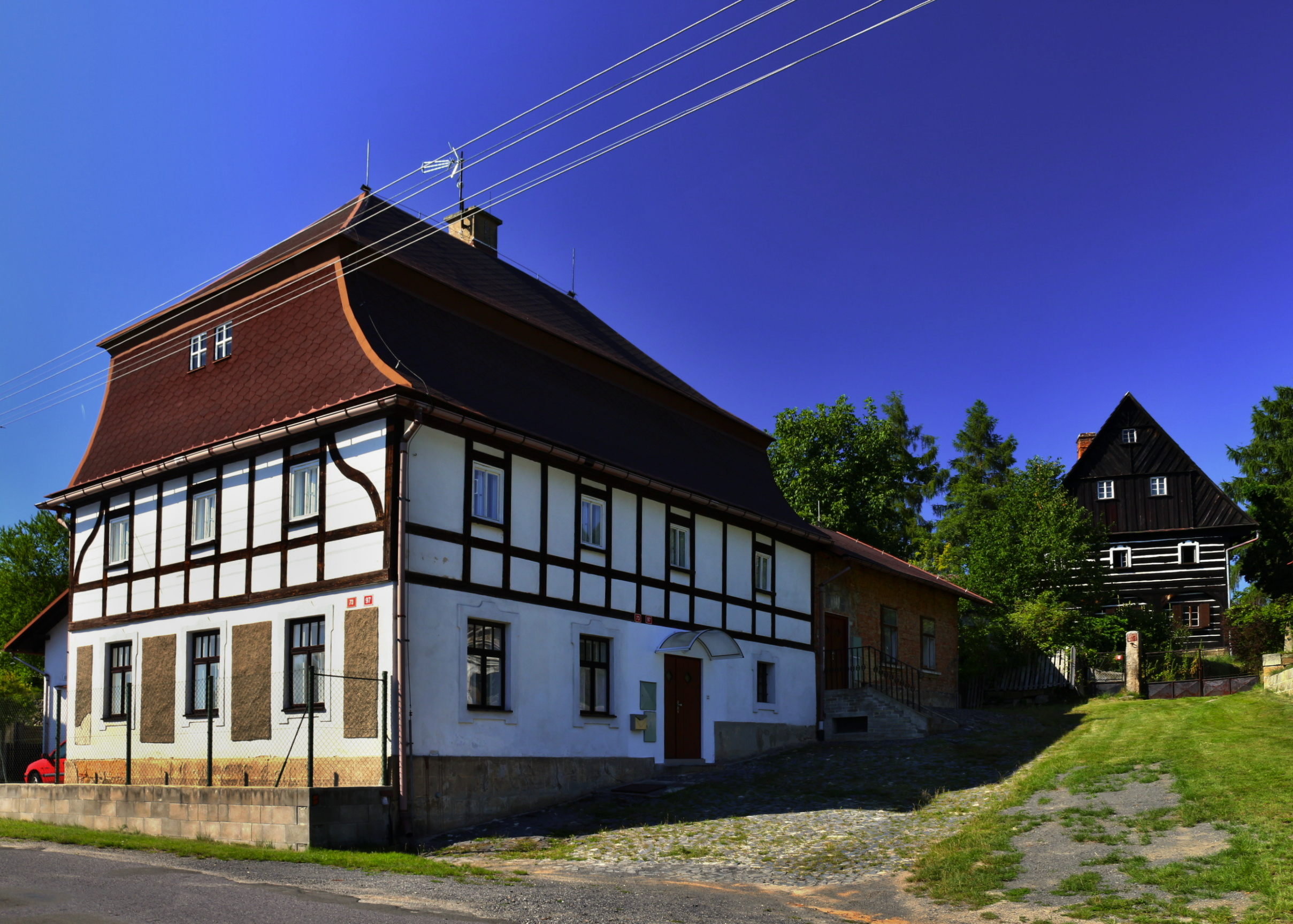
- Folk architecture houses

- Flag Coat of arms

- Location in the Czech Republic
- Coordinates: 50°41′32″N 14°44′49″E
- Country: Czech Republic
- Region: Liberec
- District: Česká Lípa
- First mentioned: 1504

Area
  - Total: 10.17 km^{2} (3.93 sq mi)
- Elevation: 290 m (950 ft)

Population (2026-01-01)
  - Total: 305
  - Density: 30.0/km^{2} (77.7/sq mi)
- Time zone: UTC+1 (CET)
  - Summer (DST): UTC+2 (CEST)
- Postal code: 471 24
- Website: www.novinypodralskem.cz

Noviny pod Ralskem (German: Neuland am Rollberge) is a municipality and village in Česká Lípa District in the Liberec Region of the Czech Republic. It has about 300 inhabitants.

== Etymology ==
The Czech name Novina (later changed to the plural form Noviny) and the German name Neuland mean 'new land'. It was a designation for newly created arable land. The suffix pod Ralskem means 'below Ralsko'.

== Geography ==
Noviny pod Ralskem is located about 14 kilometres (9 mi) east of Česká Lípa and 21 km (13 mi) west of Liberec. It lies in the Ralsko Uplands. The highest point of the municipality and entire Ralsko Uplands is the mountain Ralsko at 698 m (2,290 ft) above sea level. The Ploučnice River flows through the municipality.

== History ==
The first written mention of Noviny pod Ralskem is from 1504.

== Demographics ==
Historical population

Year	Pop.	±%
1869	538	—
1880	571	+6.1%
1890	507	−11.2%
1900	507	+0.0%
1910	495	−2.4%

Year	Pop.	±%
1921	476	−3.8%
1930	502	+5.5%
1950	287	−42.8%
1961	297	+3.5%
1970	282	−5.1%

Year	Pop.	±%
1980	279	−1.1%
1991	232	−16.8%
2001	248	+6.9%
2011	272	+9.7%
2021	297	+9.2%

Source: Censuses

== Transport ==
There are no railways or major roads passing through the municipality.

== Sights ==
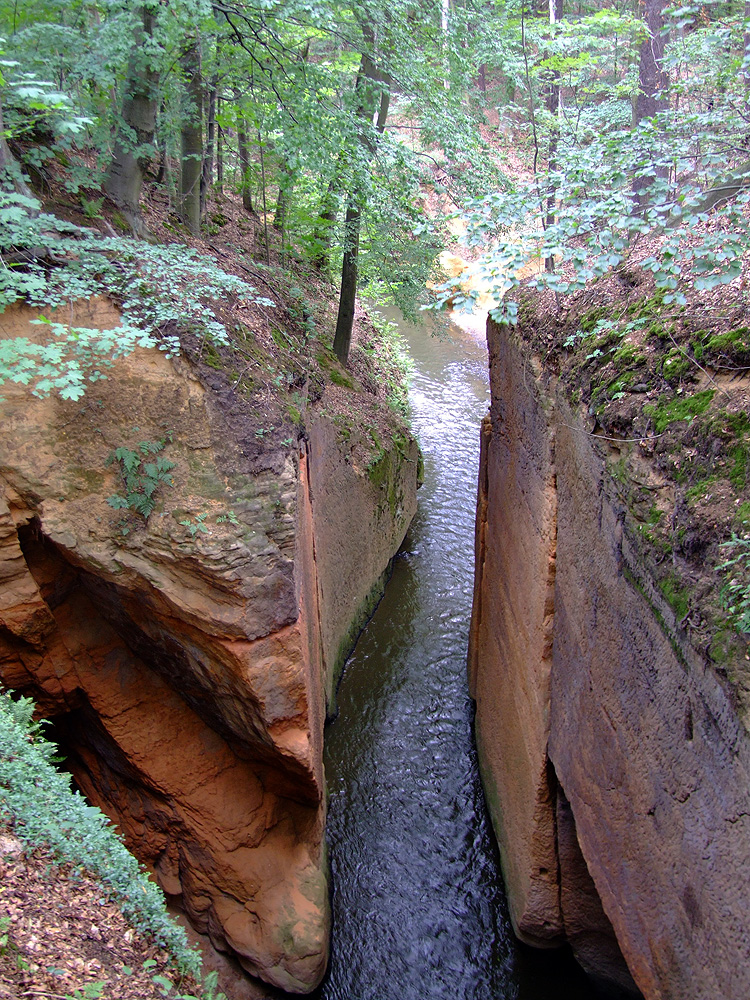
Ploučnice Gap

Noviny pod Ralskem is known for the Ploučnice Gap. It is an artificially created tunnel through the rock, which served the operation of a hammer mill. It is several centuries old and is protected as a cultural monument. It consists of two tunnels (13 and 41 metres long), through which the Ploučnice River flows and overcomes the rock barrier.

The main landmark of the centre of the village and the only sacral building is the Chapel of the Holy Trinity. It was built in the late Baroque style in 1786.

On the mountain Ralsko is a ruin of a Gothic castle. It has been desolate since the 16th century.
