= Eisenhammer Weida =

Coordinates: 50.764738°N 12.030334°E

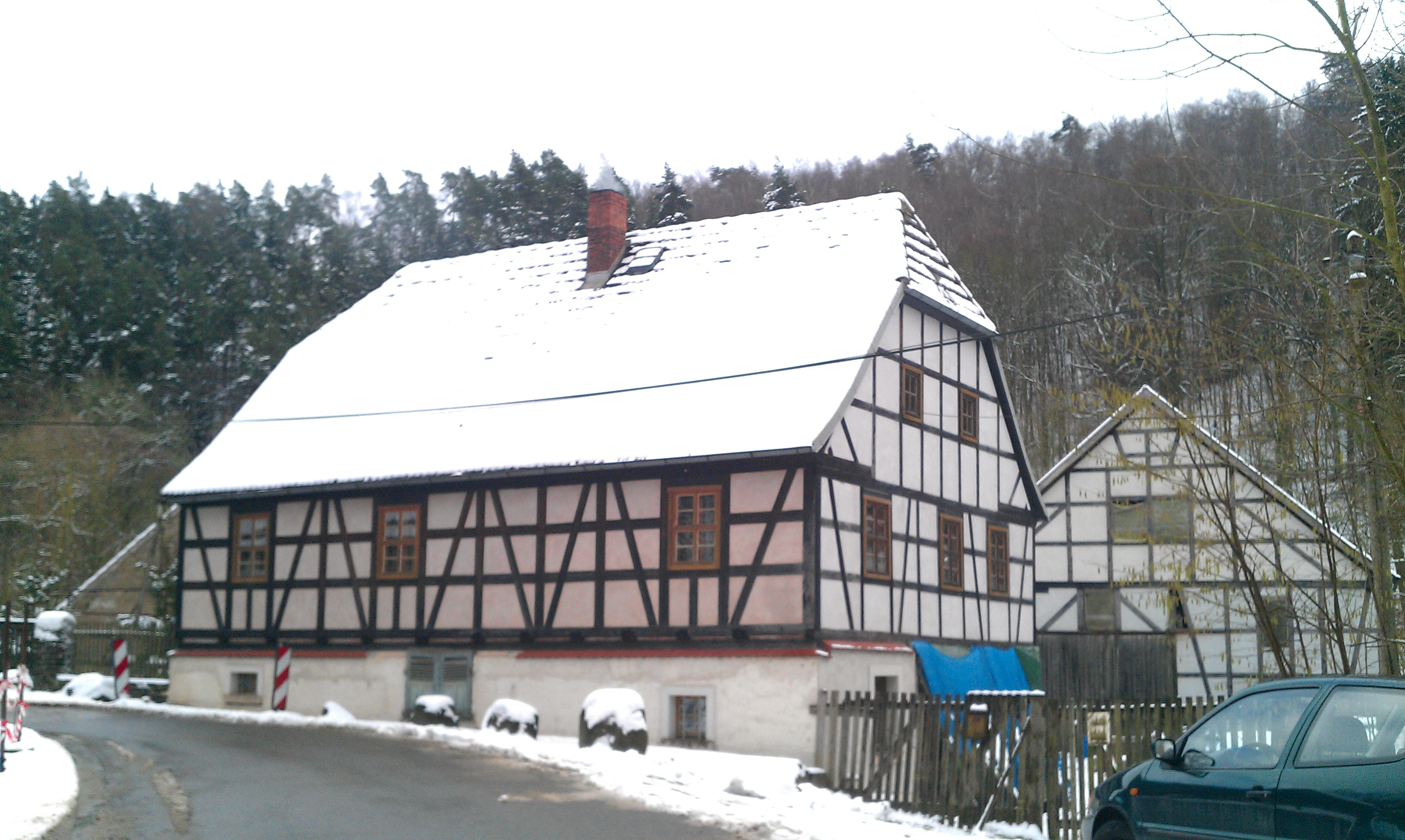
The iron hammer mill

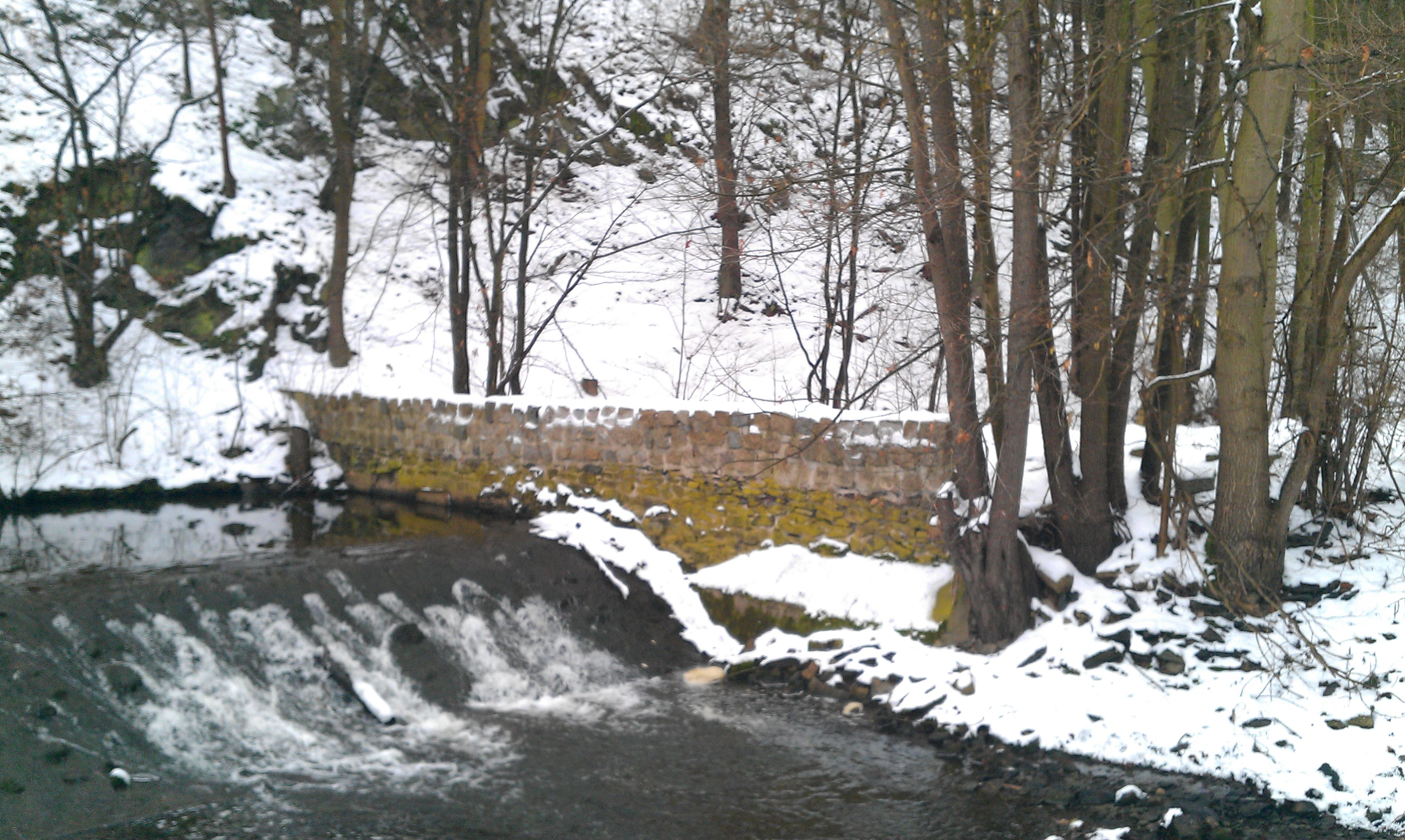
Inlet to the hammer mill weir

The Eisenhammer Weida ("Weida Iron Hammer Mill") is the oldest, working hammer mill in the German state of Thuringia. The iron hammer works lies on the River Auma in the village of Liebsdorf in the borough of Weida, just below the Auma Dam.

== History ==
In 1770 the first attempts took place to erect a hammer works on this site. The iron hammer forge was built using an available weir which was being used to irrigate the sheep pastures of Liebsdorf. In order to make better use of the water power, the building was dug into the earth, rather like a cellar. This enabled a drop of 2.70 metres for the two overshot wheels.

In earlier times, the mill made tools and components for other mills, as well as hammers, wagon parts, metal tyres, fittings, anvils, surface plates, wagon axles and – usually in summer when the water level was low – horseshoe nails.

The bell clappers made here were well known far beyond Weida; several are supposed to have weighed four hundredweight. These clappers may be found today in Naumburg Cathedral, Erfurt Cathedral, in Magdeburg, in Cologne and even in the Church of the Redeemer in Jerusalem.

The operation was closed in 1921.

== Today ==
In 1990 work began on renovating the technical monument. With the aid of monument conservation the following work was carried out: renewal of the roofing and roof truss, restoration of the mill ditch and rebuilding of two weirs as well as the restoration of the east wall.

These renovation measures were carried out under the supervision of an architect, a statistician and a geologist. In 1990 the hammer mill was sold to a private buyer.

== Literature ==
- B. Gunkel, E.-J. Müller: 800 Jahre Stadt Weida: 1209–2009. Festschrift. Wüst, 2009, 160 pages
