= Oberrödinghauser Hammer =

Industrial cultural monument in Germany

Coordinates: 51°23′53″N 7°50′39″E

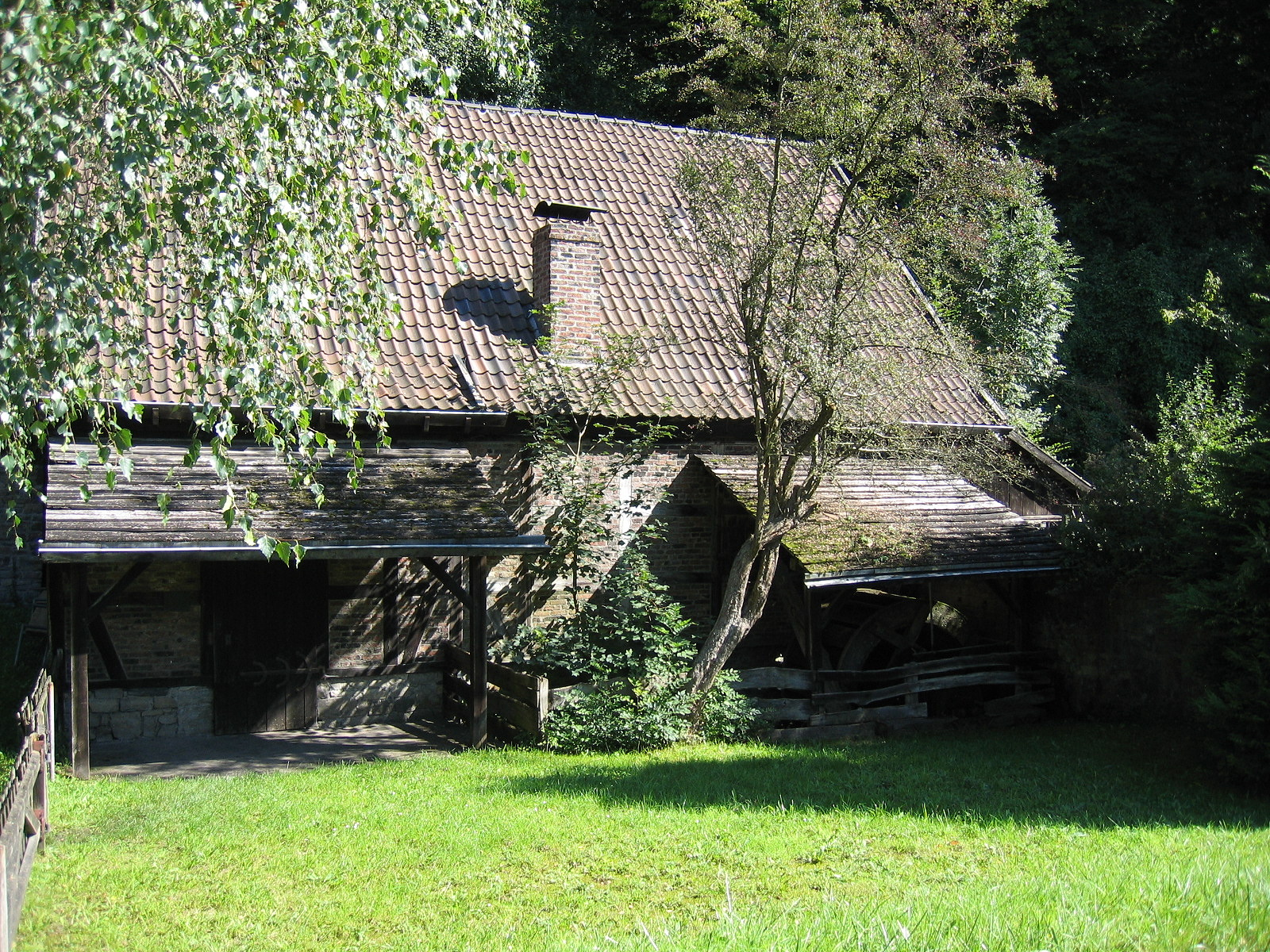
The Oberrödinghauser Hammer

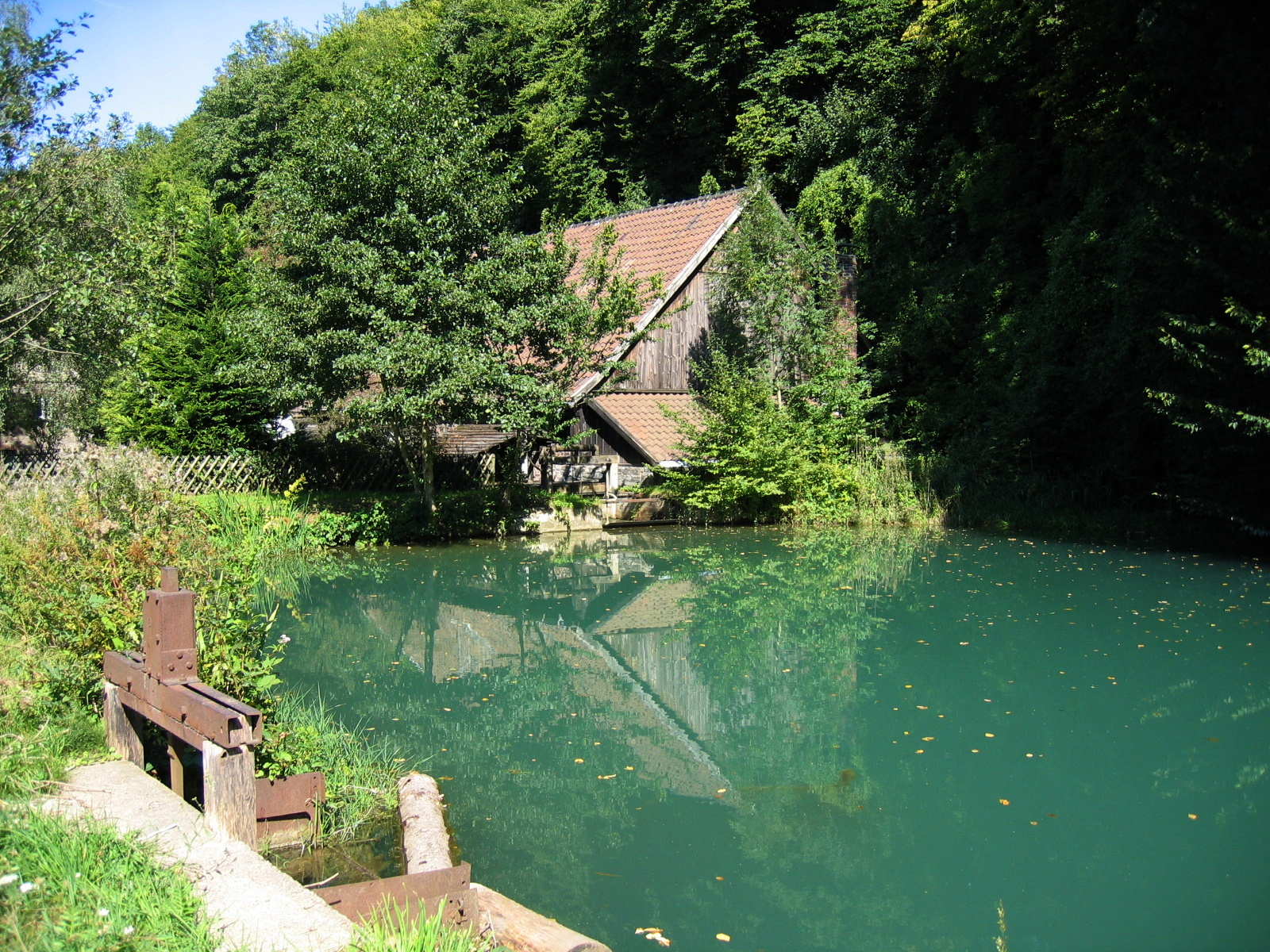
Hammer pond with a sluice in the foreground

The Oberrödinghauser Hammer is an industrial cultural monument in the village of Oberrödinghausen in the borough of Menden in the Sauerland region of Germany. The hammer mill is on the B 515 federal road opposite the potash processing plant of Rheinkalk.

The Alte Hammer ("Old Hammer Mill") was recorded as early as 1751. It was founded by Max Theodor von Dücker and was part of the Rödinghausen Ironworks (Rödinghauser Eisenfabrik). Its primary products were fire grates and ploughshares. Until it finally closed in 1955 it had been used by the Rhenish-Westphalian Potash Works (Rheinisch-Westfälische Kalkwerke) as a forge.

Formerly two water wheels drove a 70-kilogramme tilt hammer and a 300-kilogramme stave hammer (Stabhammer). The necessary water came from the Oberrödinghausen spring of Hüttenspring and was impounded in a hammer pond.
