= Auma (surname) =

Auma is a surname of Ugandan origin. Notable people with the surname include:

- Alice Auma, Ugandan politician
- Alex Auma (born 1987), Kenyan cricketer
- Hellen Auma Wandera (born 1996), Ugandan cricketer
- Linda Agnes Auma, Ugandan politician and legislator
