= Günther Brendel =

German painter (1930–2026)

Günther Brendel (Günter Brendel)
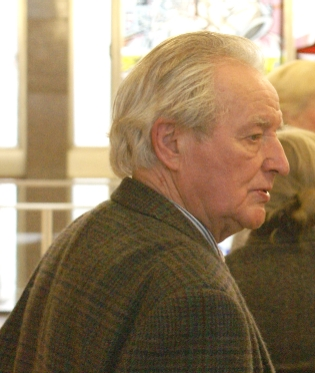
- Brendel in 2008
- Born: 17 January 1930; Weida, Thuringia, Germany
- Died: 8 January 2026 (aged 95); Berlin, Germany
- Occupations: Painter, graphic artist
- Political party: SED
- Children: Albrecht, Claudia

Günther Brendel (often incorrectly named in sources as Günter Brendel; 17 January 1930 – 8 January 2026) was a German painter and graphic artist. For many years, starting from 1969, he was Professor of Painting at the Weißensee Academy of Art Berlin.

== Life and career ==
Brendel trained and initially worked as a decorative painter between 1944 and 1948. He then studied, till 1951, under Hanns_Hoffmann-Lederer and Hermann Kirchberger at the Weimar Saxon-Grand Ducal Art School. After the Weimar art school was reorganised to become an architecture college, Brendel switched to the Dresden Academy of Fine Arts where he continued his studies under Fritz Dähn and Rudolf Bergander. He then, in 1954, worked briefly as a freelance artist in Dresden.

After moving to Berlin he took a position as an assistant at the Weißensee Academy of Art Berlin in the city's Weißensee district. He remained at The Academy, with promotions in 1956 and again in 1959 when he became an assistant professor in painting. A lectureship followed in 1964. In 1969, he took over as the Academy's Professor of Painting.

Study tours took him to the Soviet Union, Romania and Bulgaria. However, he and his wife continued to live in Berlin where he died on 8 January 2026, nine days before his 96th birthday.

== Exhibitions ==
- Berlin 1956, 1980, 2007 and 2008
- Casablanca 1967
- Weißenfels 1968
- Rudolstadt 1970

== Awards ==
- 1960 Erich Weinert Medal - Art Prize of the FDJ, especially for his painting Fest der Jugend (Youth festival)
- 1964, 1969 and 1975 Art Prize of the FDGB
- 1967 Art Prize of the German Democratic Republic
- 1969 and 1979 Goethepreis der Stadt Berlin
- 1971 National Prize of East Germany
- 1973 Theodor-Körner-Preis (DDR)
- 1976 Banner of Labor
