= Weida, Thuringia =

Weida
- Town
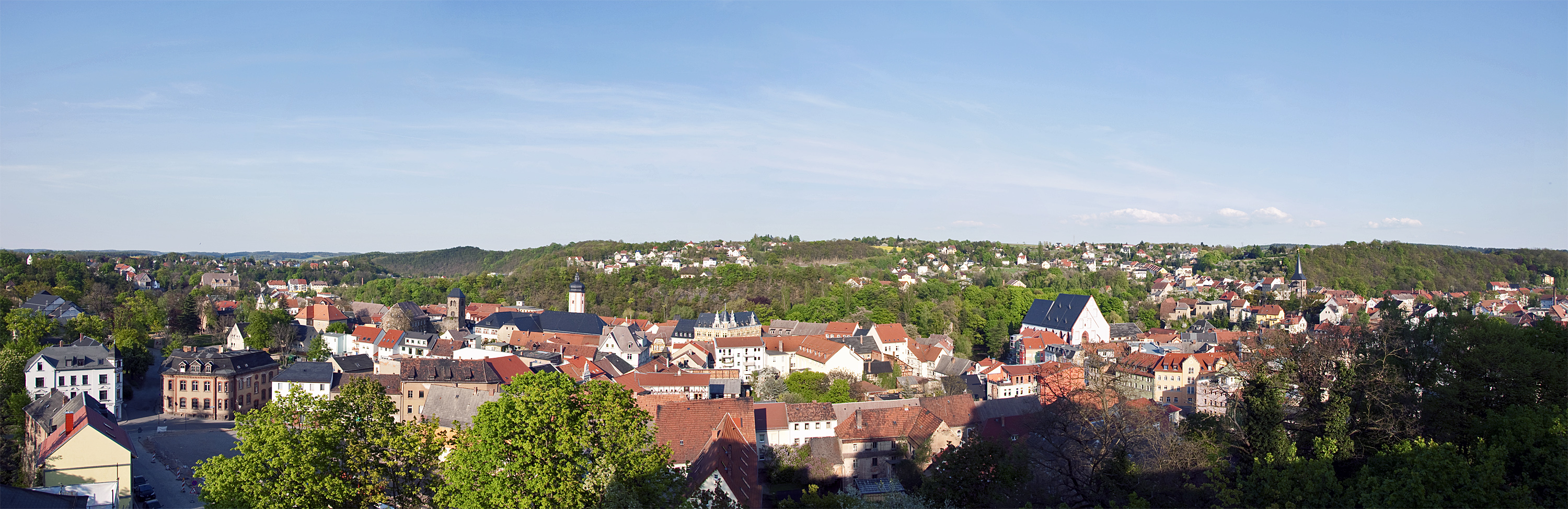

- Coat of arms

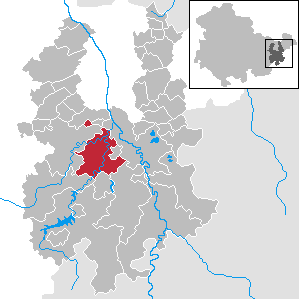
- Location of Weida within Greiz district
- Interactive map of Weida
- Location within Germany Location within Thuringia
- Coordinates: 50°46′30″N 12°3′25″E
- Country: Germany
- State: Thuringia
- District: Greiz
- Subdivisions: 2

Government
  - Mayor (2024–30): Udo Geldner

Area
  - Total: 36.8 km^{2} (14.2 sq mi)
- Elevation: 231 m (758 ft)

Population (2025-12-31)
  - Total: 7,939
  - Density: 216/km^{2} (559/sq mi)
- Time zone: UTC+01:00 (CET)
  - Summer (DST): UTC+02:00 (CEST)
- Postal codes: 07565–07570
- Dialling codes: 036603
- Vehicle registration: GRZ
- Website: www.weida.de

Weida (German pronunciation: [ˈvaɪda]) is a town in the district of Greiz, in Thuringia, Germany, situated 12 km south of Gera on the river Weida.

== History ==
Within the German Empire (1871-1918), Weida was part of the Grand Duchy of Saxe-Weimar-Eisenach.

The Eisenhammer Weida is a historic hammer mill.

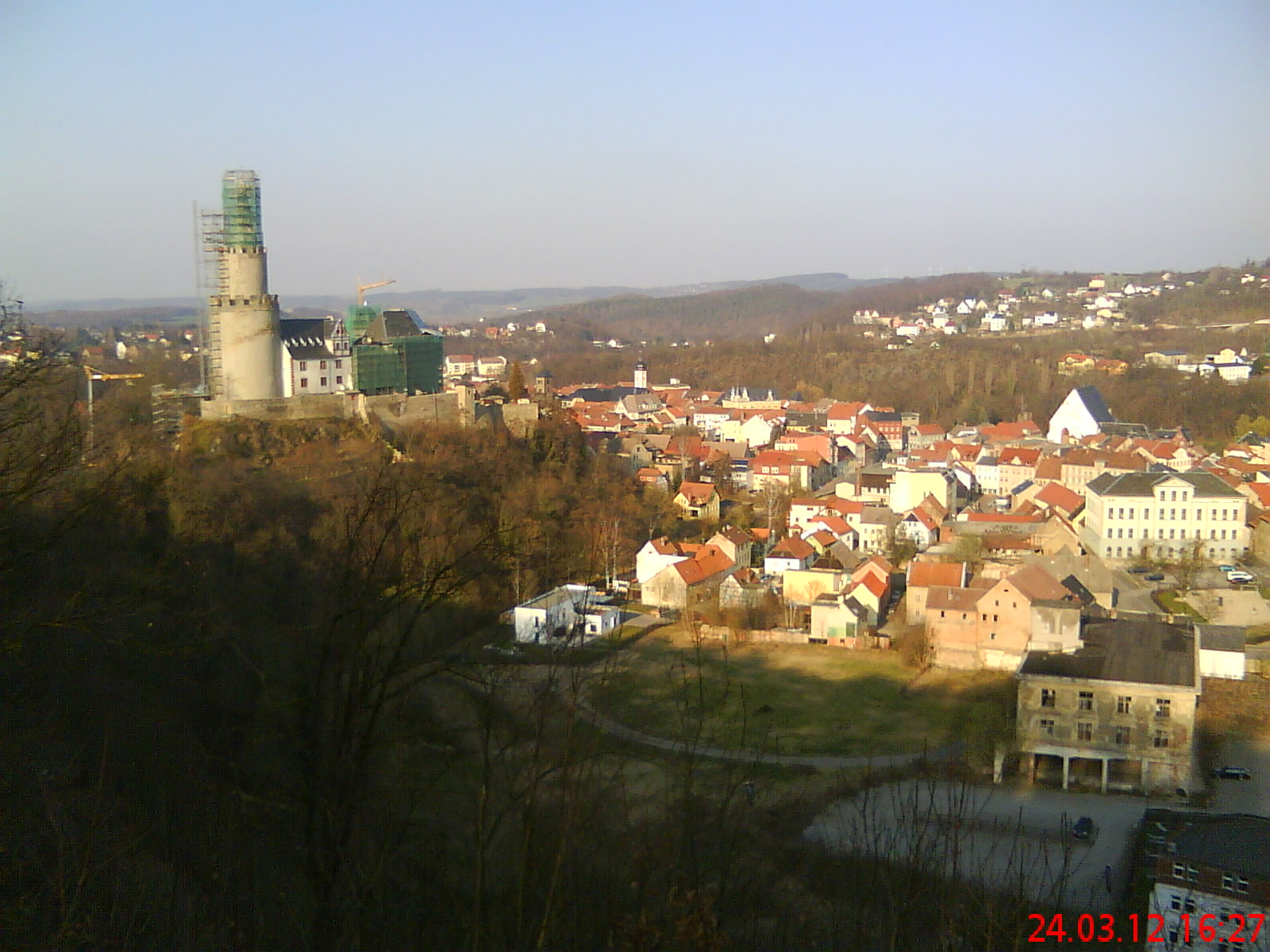
The Osterburg and city of Weida

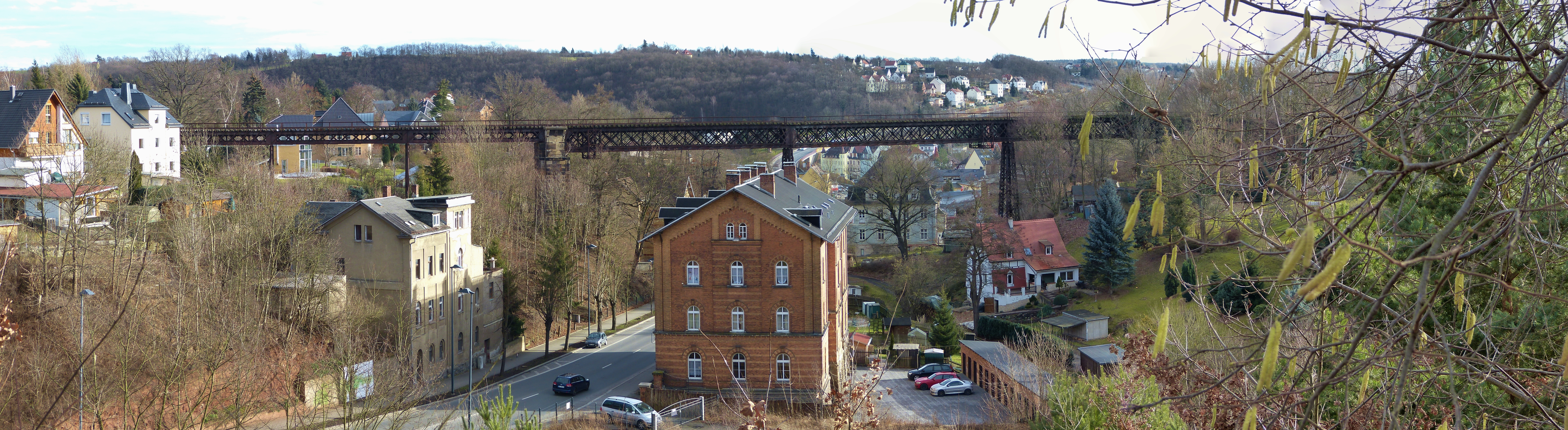
The Oschütztal-Viadukt in Weida

== Notable people ==
- Günther Brendel (1930–2026), painter
