= Tobiashammer =

Large, water-driven hammer mill in Germany

Coordinates: 50.801873°N 10.731776°E

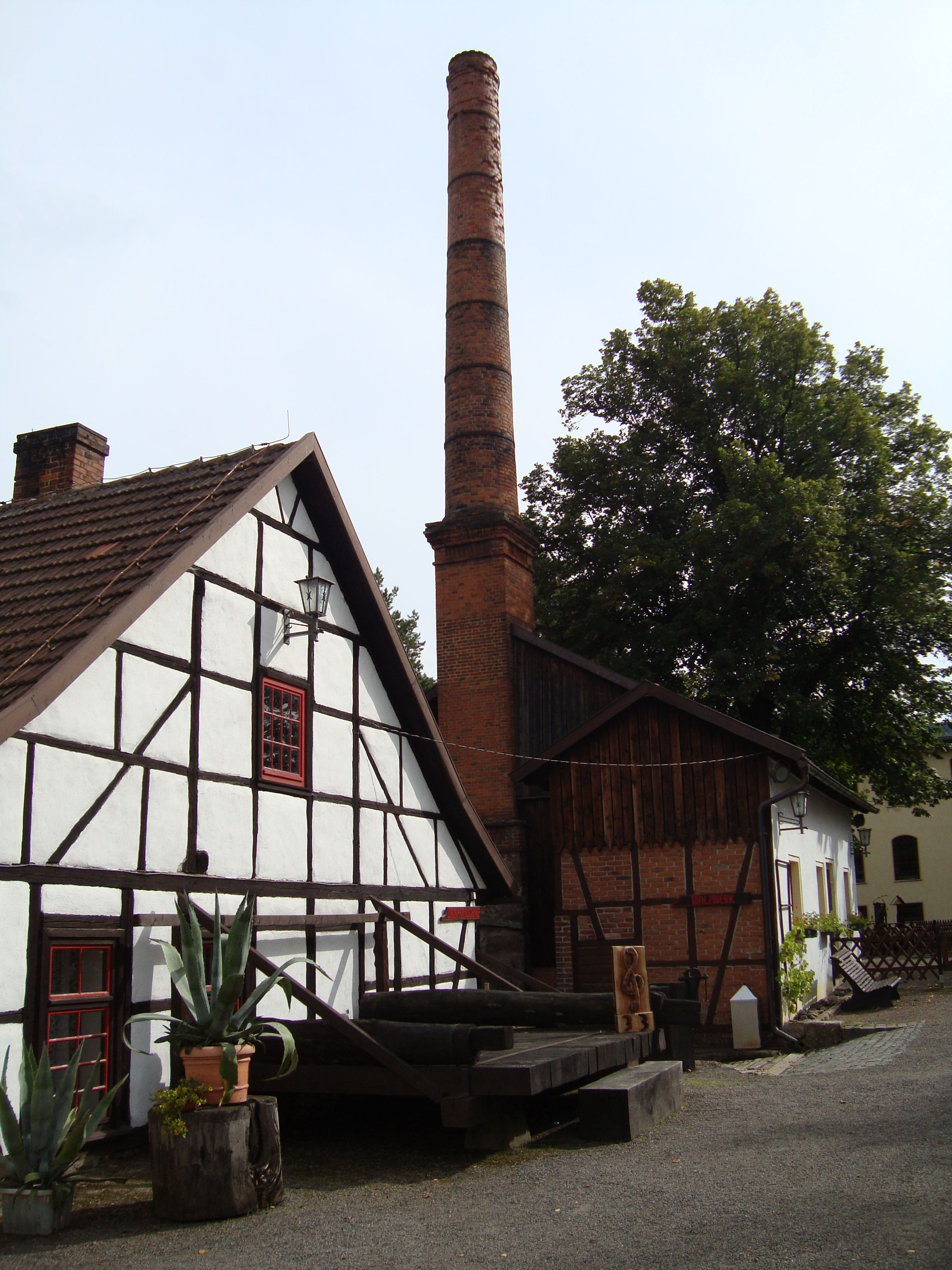
The Tobiashammer

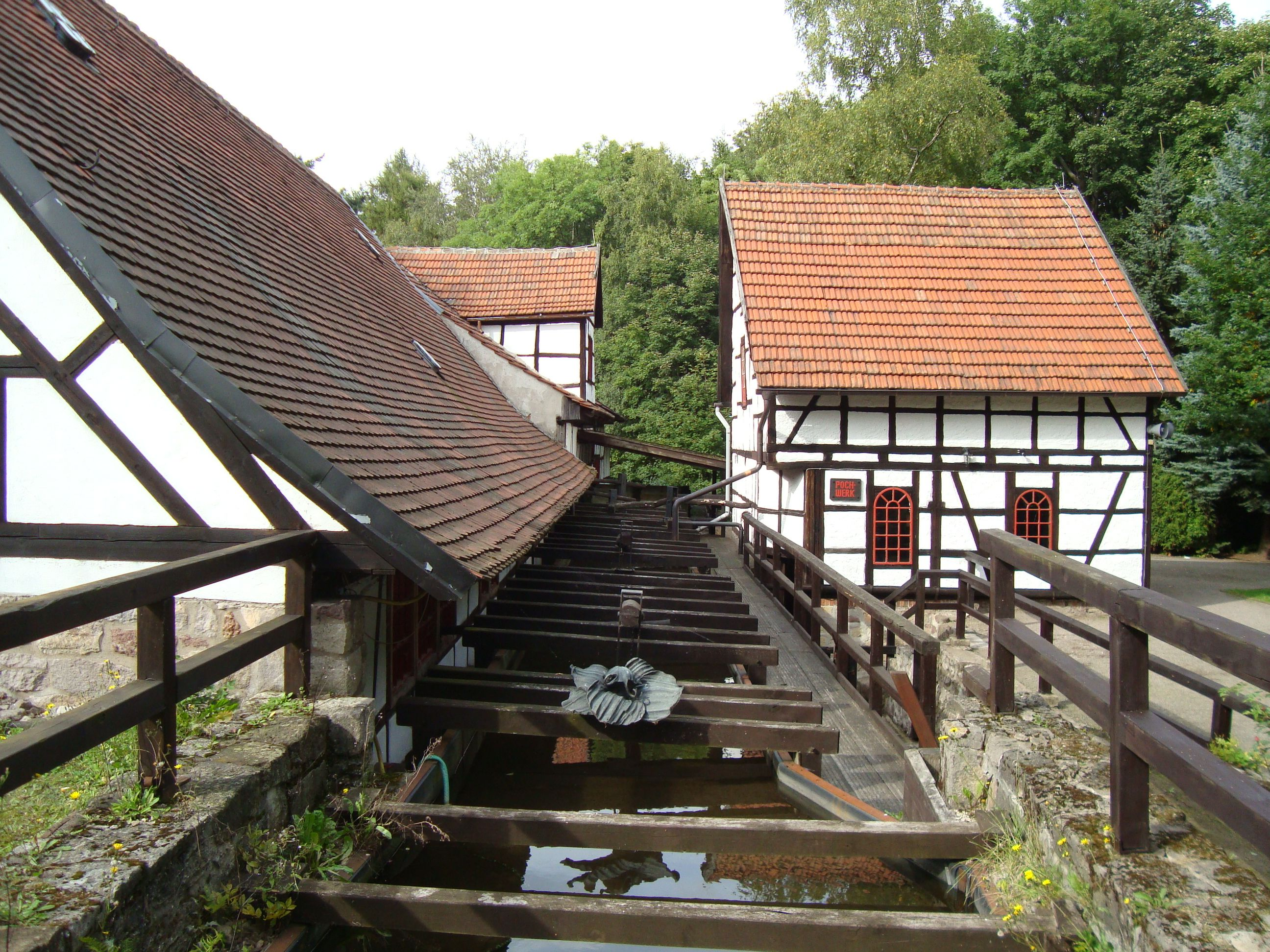
The Tobiashammer and the Neues Leben metal sculptor's smithy

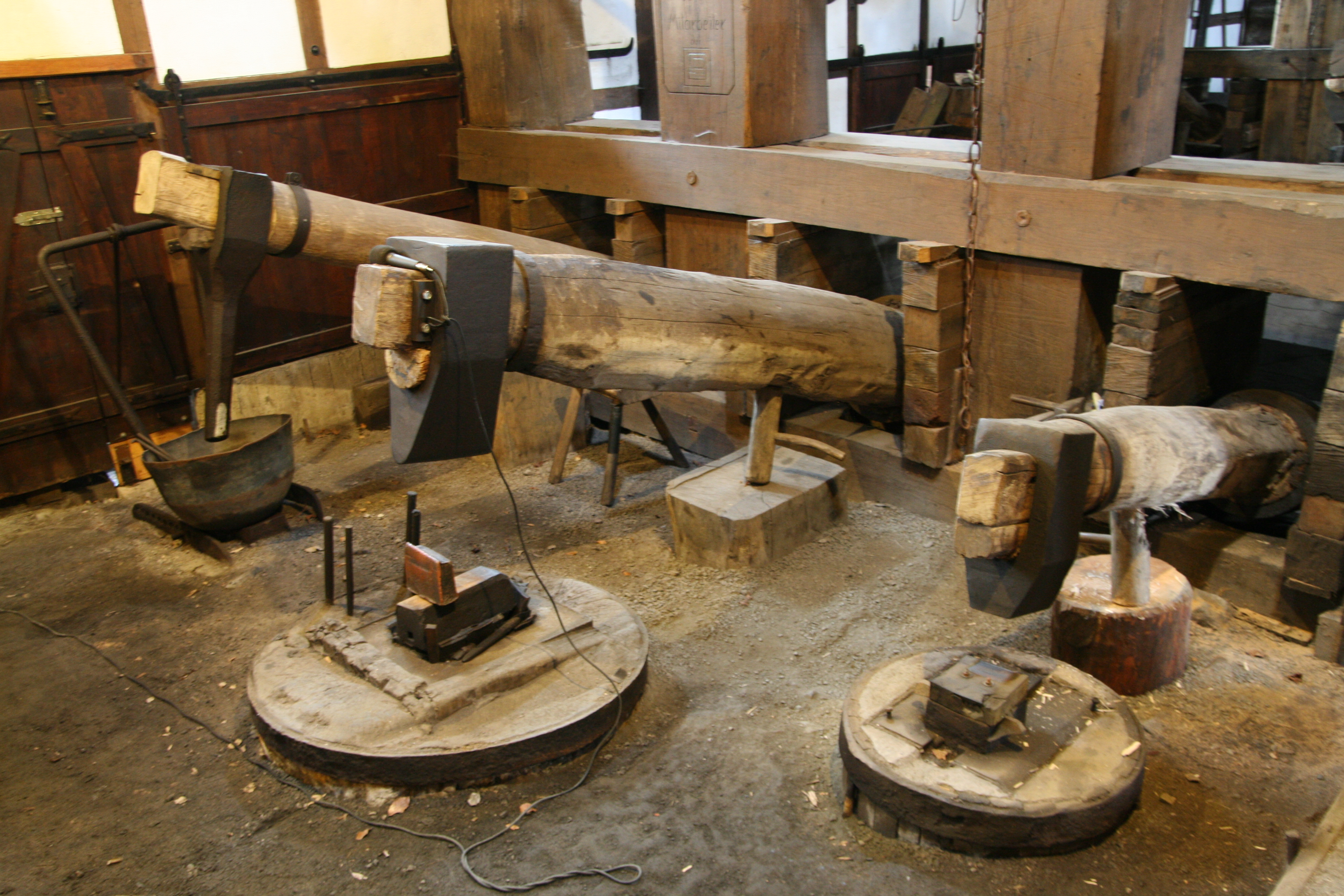
Three of the five tilt hammers

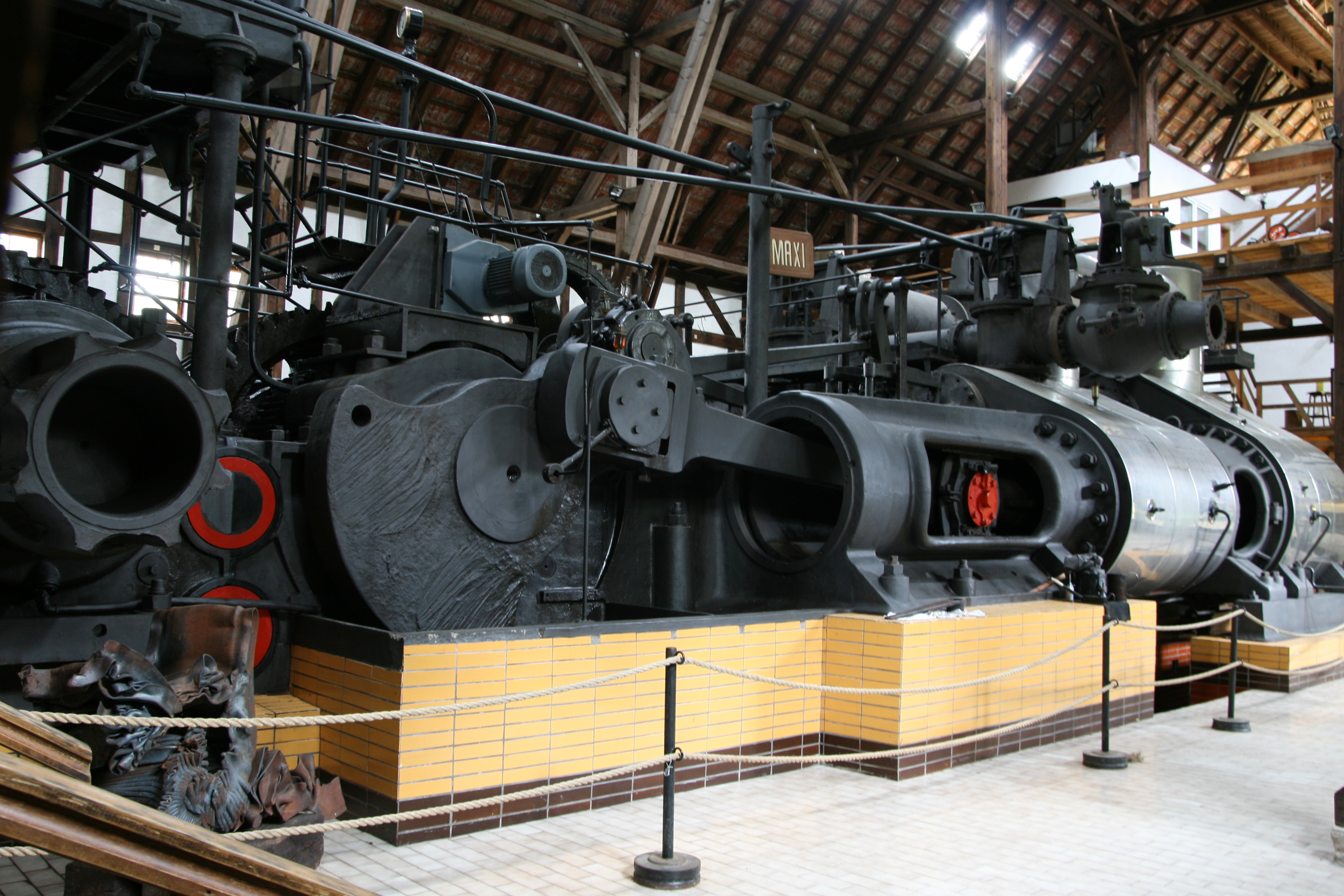
One half of the 12,000 hp steam engine

The Tobiashammer is a large, water-driven hammer mill in Ohrdruf in the German state of Thuringia. The mill, which dates to 1482, has been an industrial monument and museum since 1983.

== History ==
The first hammer forge was probably built in 1482 on the River Ohra. In 1592 the mill was bought by Tobias Albrecht, since when it has been named after him. The works originally had three huge iron hammers which were raised by the motion of a water wheel.

The mill made iron products such as scythes, sickles, ploughshares, lances and swords. Later, it also carried out copper processing; washbowls, washtubs, kettle drums, brewing implements, pots, cans and pans were made. The kettle drums, which were produced into the late 20th century, were made from a single piece of copper, forged under the tilt hammer and still set a standard today in terms of their sound.

The Tobiashammer was owned by the Albrecht family until 1816 when they sold it. Thereafter its owners changed more often. From the mid-19th century the mill was significantly enlarged. A rolling mill and a second hammer mill was built. The office (Kontorhaus), built in 1882, now acts as a restaurant, the Hammerschenke.

In 1972 the old, ruined hammer mill was bought from private owners by the Ohrdruf Steelworks.
In 1983 the Tobiashammer was opened to the public as a demonstration mill.

== Museum, technology and art ==
The museum has five working trip hammers, a rolling mill, stamp mill and grinding workshop as well as furnaces. The mill is still driven by four water wheels.

Since 1988 the Tobiashammer has also housed one of the largest steam engines in Europe: a twin, tandem, reversing, steam engine, built in 1920, with a total weight of 305 tonnes and a power output of 12,000 horsepower. It comes from the old Maxhütte smeltery at Unterwellenborn and was decommissioned in 1985. The engine is fully working and is operated during guided tours.

An annual event that has taken place since the museum's opening in 1983 is the Blacksmiths’ Symposium (Schmiede-Symposium). In 2009 it was entitled "Tribute to Fritz Kühn" and brought together ornamental metalsmiths from three continents. Over the years many well-known metalsmiths and metal sculptors have created their works of art here. Many still grace the outer areas of the museum site as part of its sculpture park, such as the gigantic, forged water lily by Alfred Habermann and Das Gesicht by Rüdiger Roehl.

== Literature ==
- Wolfgang Schmidt, Wilfried Theile: Denkmale der Produktions- und Verkehrsgeschichte. Teil 1. VEB Verlag für Bauwesen, Berlin, 1989, ISBN 3-345-00312-0
- Eberhard Wächtler: Tobiashammer Ohrdruf. Stahlverformungswerk Ohrdruf, 1987
- Manfred Beckert: Metallgestaltung im Tobiashammer. 25 Jahre Metallgestalter-Symposium im Tobiashammer, Steinbeis-Edition 2008, ISBN 3-938062-29-0
- Tobiashammer: ein Kunstbuch. Verlag für Schweißen und Verwandte Verfahren, DVS-Verlag, 1999
