= Weida (White Elster) =

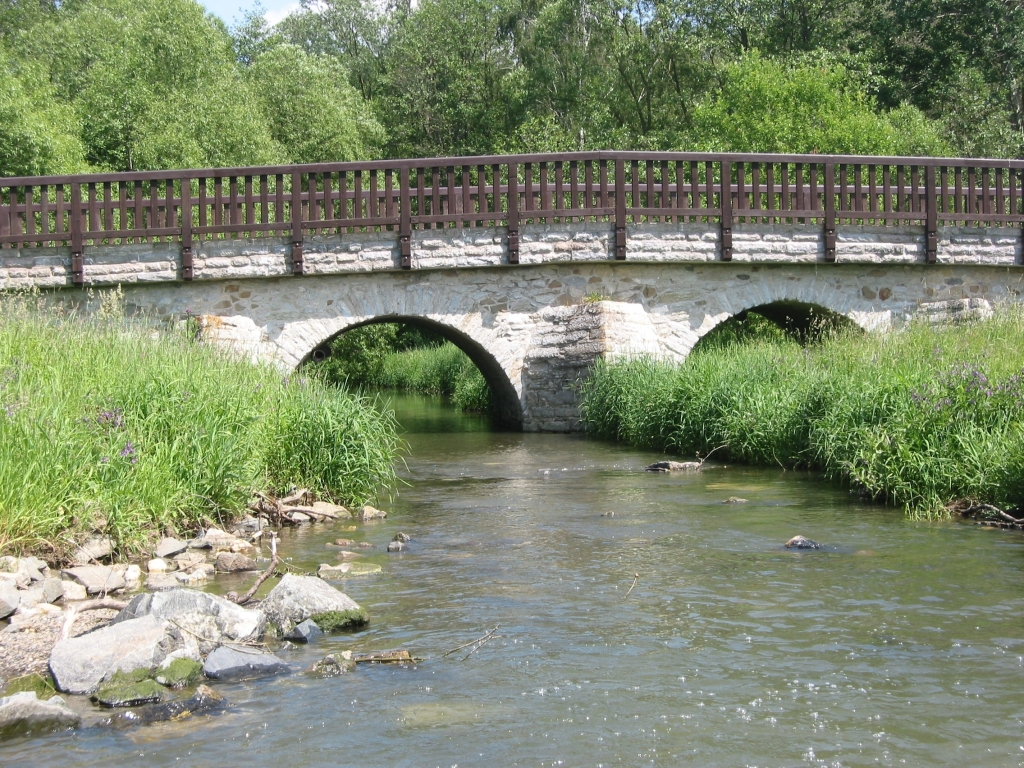
- The Weida in Lawitz

Location
- Country: Germany
- State: Thuringia

Physical characteristics
- Source
  - location: near Pausa
  - elevation: 500 m (1,600 ft)
- Mouth
  - location: White Elster
  - coordinates: 50°47′44″N 12°5′21″E
- Length: 57 km (35 mi)

Basin features
- Progression: White Elster→ Saale→ Elbe→ North Sea

The Weida (German pronunciation: [ˈvaɪda]) is a non-navigable river in eastern Thuringia, Germany, left tributary of the White Elster. Most of its course is situated in the district of Greiz.

The Weida's source is near Pausa in Saxony; it then flows through the Thuringian Highland passing Zeulenroda-Triebes and through the eponymous Weida. It then feeds into the White Elster near Wünschendorf/Elster. Its tributaries include the Auma and the Leuba.
