= Central European Iron Trail =

The Central European Iron Trail is a European Cultural Route which combines local iron routes with institutions as well as places that represent important parts of the European iron cultural heritage. The aim of the route is to increase understanding of the history, the culture and the traditions of the Central European iron areas in 8 countries. The “Central European Iron Trail” was recognised as a “cultural route of the Council of Europe” in 2007.

== A cultural route of the Council of Europe ==
Following a suggestion by the "European Iron Trail" working group, a project for an iron route on a European scale was presented in Bourglinster (LU) to the European Institute of Cultural Routes (Luxembourg) invitation in 2004. In February 2007, the Council of Europe recognised the initiative of the Montahistorischer Verein Österreichs working group as a "cultural route of the Council of Europe" called: "Central European Iron Trail" (Mitteleuropäische Eisenstraße; Route du Fer en Europe Centrale). The Central-European Iron Trail Association was created in April 2008 in Eisenstadt in the presence of many politic and scientist personalities. The "cultural routes of the Council of Europe" are tools of the European cultural cooperation implemented by the Council of Europe with the "European cultural convention" in 1954. The programme of the "cultural routes of the Council of Europe" was officially created in 1987 and is managed by an executive agency of the Council of Europe in Luxembourg since 1998: The European Institute of Cultural Routes. The programme is ruled by a resolution adopted by the Committee of Ministers of the Council of Europe. The "cultural routes of the Council of Europe" aims at the protection, the valorisation and the transmission of the European cultural heritage as well as the cultural diversity of Europe. They also aim at the development of the intercultural dialog.

== The association ==
The Central European Iron Trail Association was created on 11 April 2008 in Eisenstadt (ZVR-Nr. 959952283). Members can be individuals, institutions, partners and sponsors. The members are entitled to participate to the constitution of the cultural route and to use the network’s logo. The association is supervised by a president, who assists and controls the executive board and the general assemblies.

== Participating institutions ==
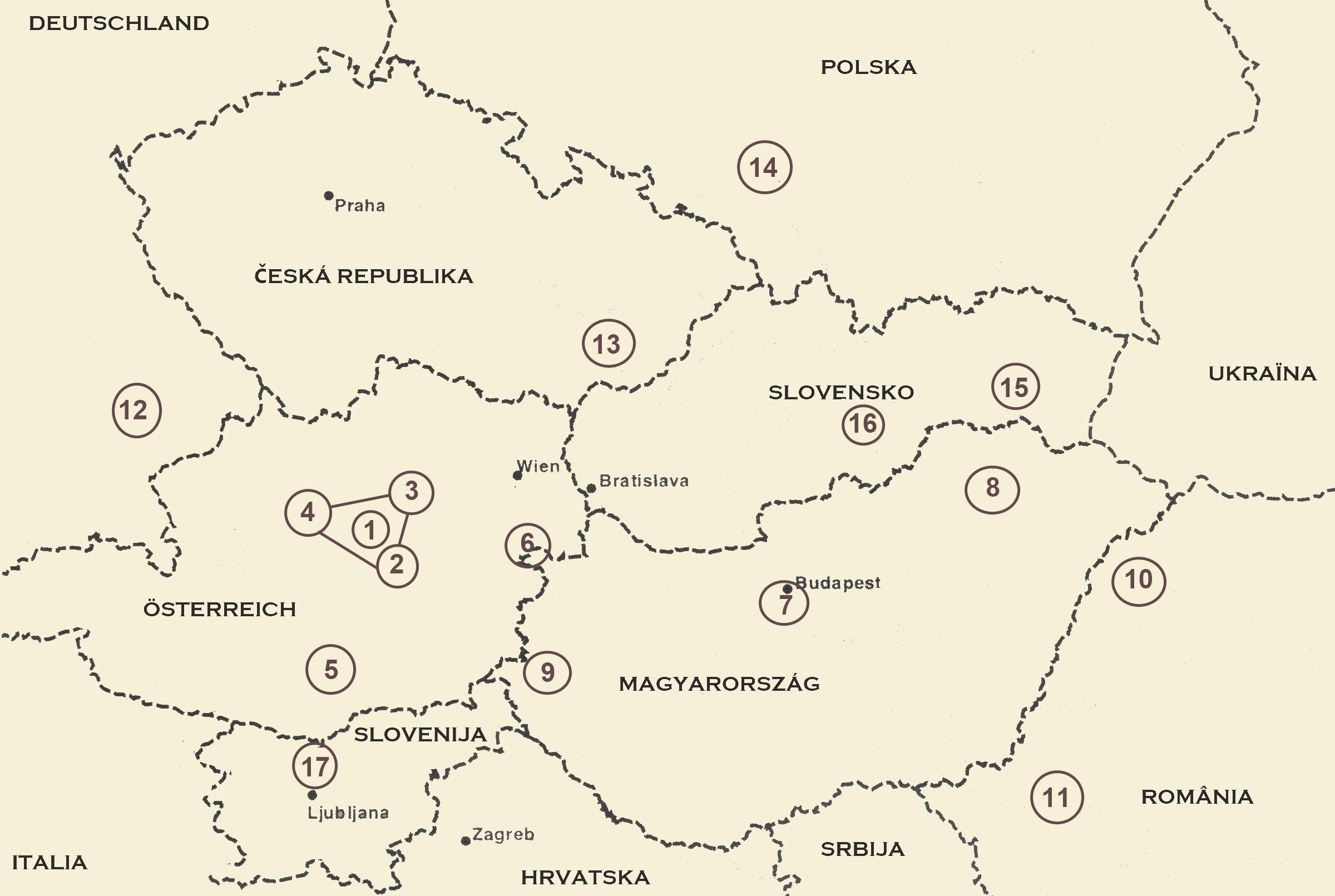
Map of participating institutions (numbers correspond to numbering in this paragraph)

1 - Die Steirische Eisenstraße, Eisenerz / Museumsverbund Steirische Eisenstraße, Trofaiach / Geschichte-Club ALPINE, Leoben-Donawitz / Arbeitsgemeinschaft Österreichische Eisenstraße
2 - Radwerk IV in Vordernberg, Leoben / Marktgemeinde Vordernberg, Vordernberg / Montanhistorischer Verein Österreich (MHVÖ), Leoben-Donawitz
3 -Verein Kulturpark Eisenstraße-Ötscherland, Ybbsitz
4 - Verein Eisenstraße Oberösterreich, Steinbach an der Steyr
5 - Montangeschichtlicher Verein Norisches Eisen, Hüttenberg
6 - Norisch-Pannonische Eisenstraße, Eisenstadt
7 - Országos Magyar Bányászati és Kohászati Egyesület (OMBKE), Budapest / Műszaki és Természettudományi Egyesületek Szövetsége (MTESZ), Budapest / Öntödei Múzeum, Budapest
8 - Kohászati Múzeum, Miskolc
9 - Magyar Olajipari múzeum, Zalaegerszeg
10 - Erdélyi Magyar Műszaki Tudományos Társaság (EMT - Societatea Tehnico-Ştiinţifică Maghiară din Transilvania), Cluj-Napoca
11 - Universitatea Eftimie Murgu, Reşiţa
12 - Arbeitsgemeinschaft Bayerische Eisenstraße, Amberg
13 - Technické muzeum v Brně
14 - Stowarzyszenie Inżynierów i Techników Przemysłu Hutniczego (SITPH), Katowice
15 - Slovenska železná cesta, Kosice / Slovenské technické múzeum, Kosice
16 - Slovenské banské múzeum (slowakisches Bergbaumuseum), Banská Štiavnica
17 - Museum Ravne na Koroskem, Ravne na Koroskem
