= Auma (river) =

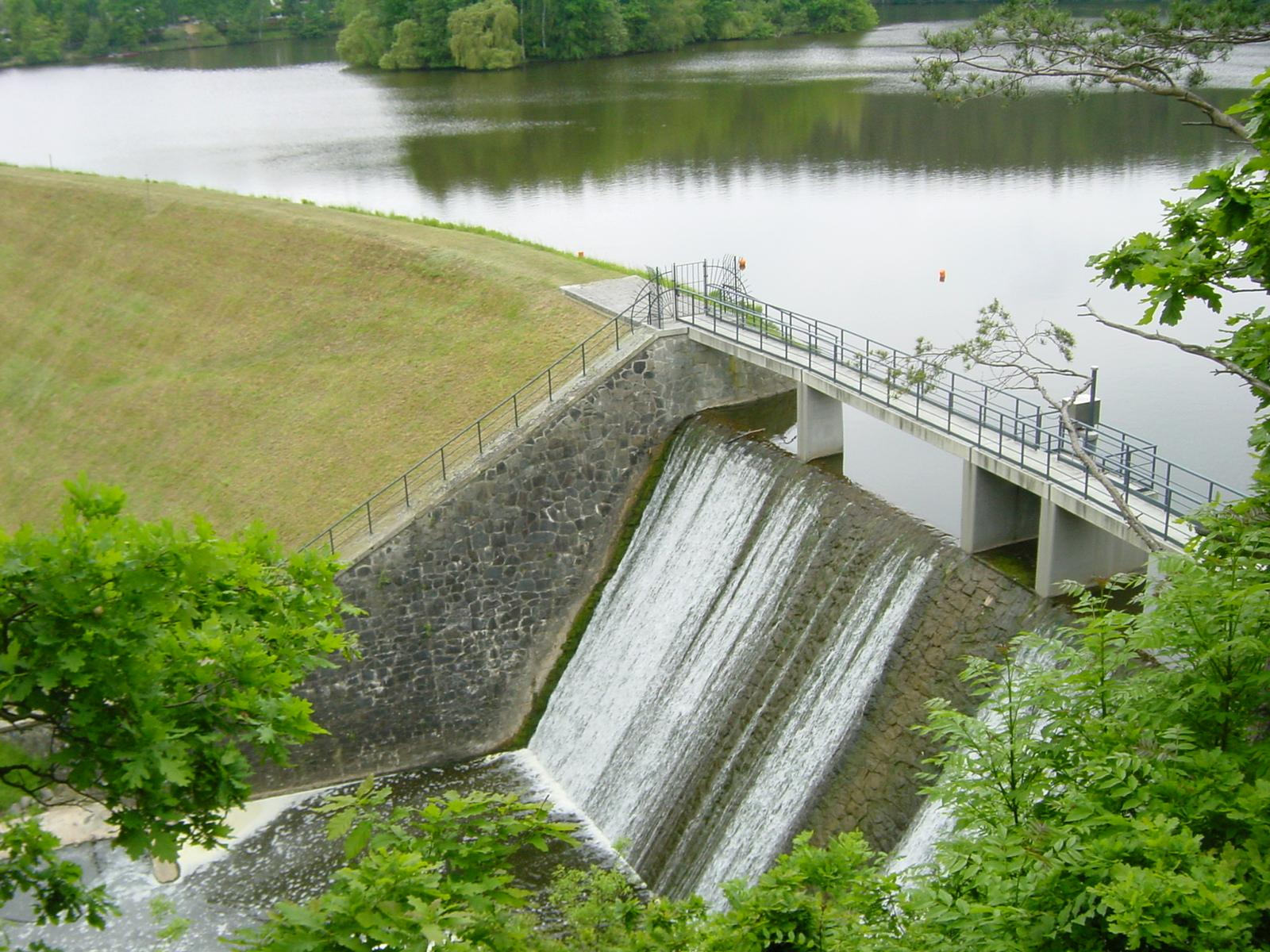
- Dam in the Auma

Location
- Country: Germany
- State: Thuringia

Physical characteristics
- Mouth
  - location: Weida
  - coordinates: 50.7762°N 12.0629°E

Basin features
- Progression: Weida→ White Elster→ Saale→ Elbe→ North Sea

Auma is a river of Thuringia, Germany. It is a tributary of the Weida, which it joins in the town Weida.

== See also ==
- List of rivers of Thuringia
