= Linda Agnes Auma =

Ugandan politician

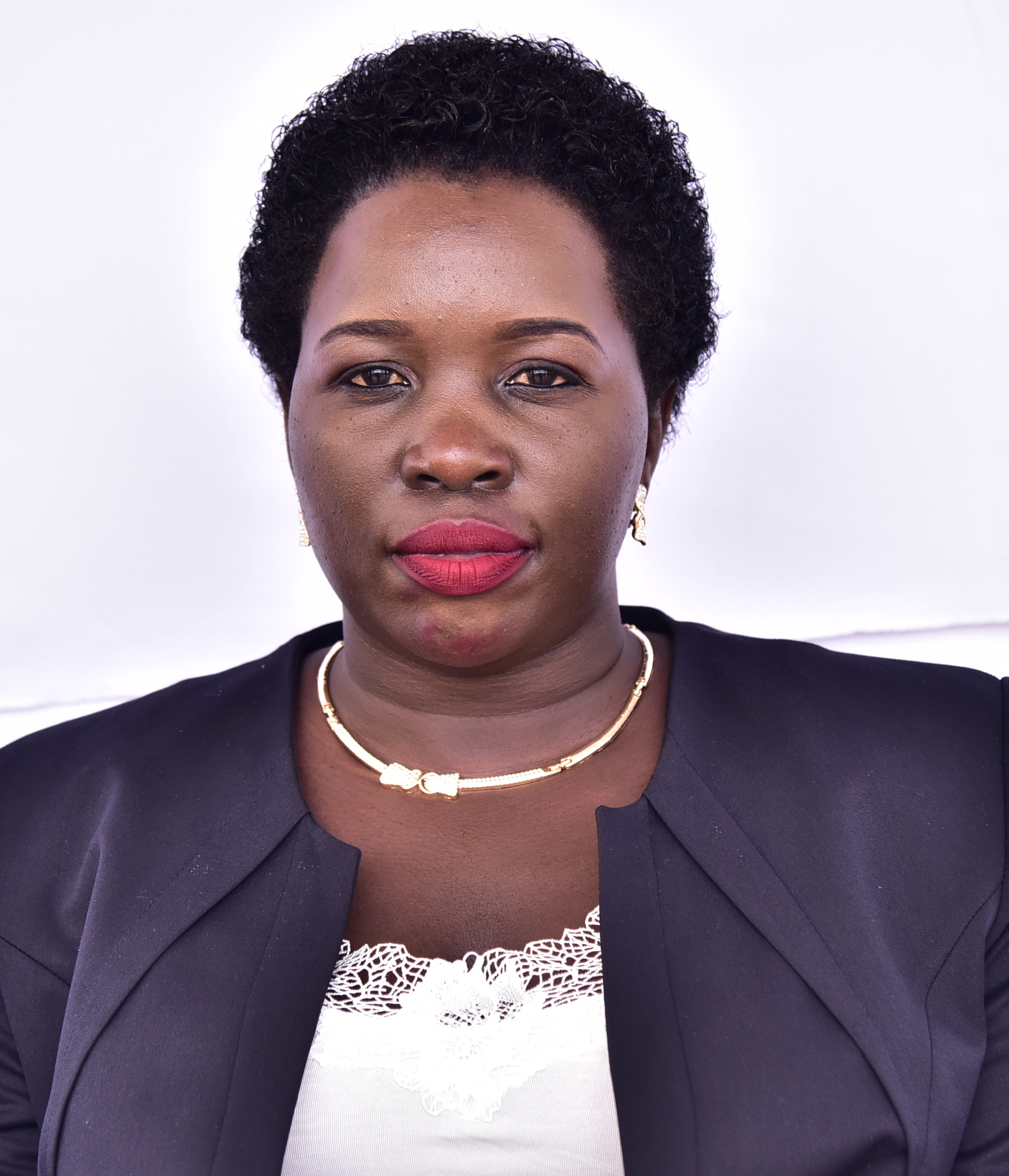
- Linda Agnes Auma

Woman Member of Parliament for Lira District
- Incumbent
- Assumed office May 2021

Chairperson Agriculture Animal Industries and Fisheries
- Incumbent
- Assumed office June 2024

Lira District National Resistance Movement Chairperson
- Incumbent
- Assumed office August 2025

Personal details
- Party: Independent
- Occupation: Politician, Legislator

Linda Agnes Auma is a Ugandan politician and legislator. She represents the people of Lira District as the woman member of parliament in the 11th Parliament of Uganda, which she entered on an independent ticket. She is the Vice Chairperson National Women Council. Auma is the Chairperson of Parliamentary Committee on Agriculture, Animal Industry and Fisheries; she is also the Publicity Secretary for Uganda Women Parliamentary Association (UWOPA) and Lango Parliamentary Group.

Auma is the current Lira District National Resistance Movement party Chairperson, and she assumed office in August 2025.

She previously worked as the Resident District Commissioner of Amuru District a position she relinquished in 2021 to join parliament.

== Early life and education ==
Auma is a daughter of the late major general David Oyite Ojok, a Uganda National Liberation Army (UNLA) Chief of Staff during the 2nd presidency of Dr Apollo Milton Obote.

Auma lost his father when she was 2 years old. Oyite Ojok perished in a helicopter accident on December 2, 1983 enroute a mission to assess the advancement of a guerilla rebel movement, National Liberation Army (NRA) led by Yoweri Kaguta Museveni, who later seized power in 1986.

Auma also lost her mother when she was 8 years old, which left her a total orphan and her early childhood and life was characterized by poverty and misery. From childhood, Auma and her sibling Atim Vicky were raised by their maternal grandmother in Ocamonyang, Agali Sub county in Lira District. She went to school with the help of well-wishers when the grandmother couldn't afford to raise tuition for her. She became a child mother having given birth to her firstborn daughter at the age of 16.

At the age of 26, Auma as a mother of 2 returned to school to complete her O'level education and her school fees were paid by president Yoweri Museveni, who fought alongside her father in UNLA to oust President Amin

She thereafter did a certificate course in accounting and enrolled for a diploma in business administration and later pursued a bachelor's degree in Business administration.

== Career ==
Auma entered into politics by contesting and becoming Lira Municipal youth chairperson under the National Youth Council, she was later in 2006 elected the youth councillor for the central division in Lira municipal council.

In the 2016 she sought the Lira District Woman MP seat on the National Resistance Movement ticket but lost in the primaries. Joyce Ongom of the Uganda People's Congress (UPC) would win the MP seat.

After the 2016 Uganda general elections, Auma was appointed by president Museveni as RDC of Amuru district.

In the run to the 2021 Uganda general elections, Auma won Florence Angina in the NRM party primaries, but her victory was nullified after a vote recount.

Florence Angina was declared the NRM flag bearer for the Lira woman member of parliament seat, this prompted Auma to run as an independent candidate and was the eventual winner in the general elections.

In the parliament of Uganda, Auma serves on the committee of Agriculture Animal Industries and Fisheries, Spokesperson of Lango Parliamentary Group as well as the publicity secretary of Uganda Women Parliamentary Association (UWOPA).

== Personal life ==
Auma's first born daughter Shakila Among Mwenyi was crowned Miss Lira in 2017. She was also the face of Lango Cultural Heritage and was crowned Miss Tourism Northern Region in 2020. Shakila Among also represents the youth of Lira City at Lira City Council as the Female Youth Councilor. Shakila is the current Deputy Speaker of Lira City Council.

== See Also ==
- Betty Amongi
- Jane Aceng
- Anita Among
- Thomas Tayebwa
