= Edelsfeld =

- Municipality
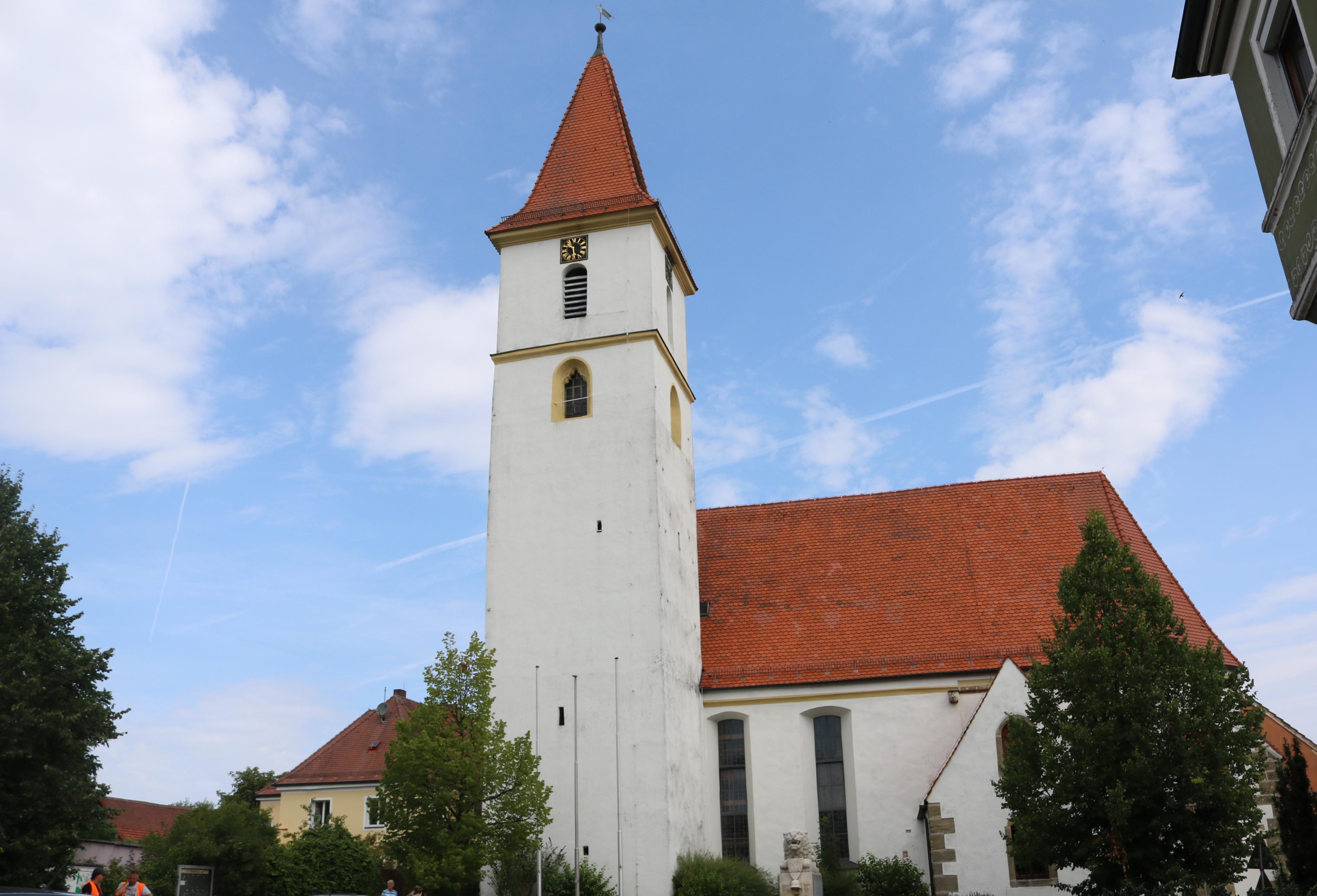
- Church of Saint Stephen

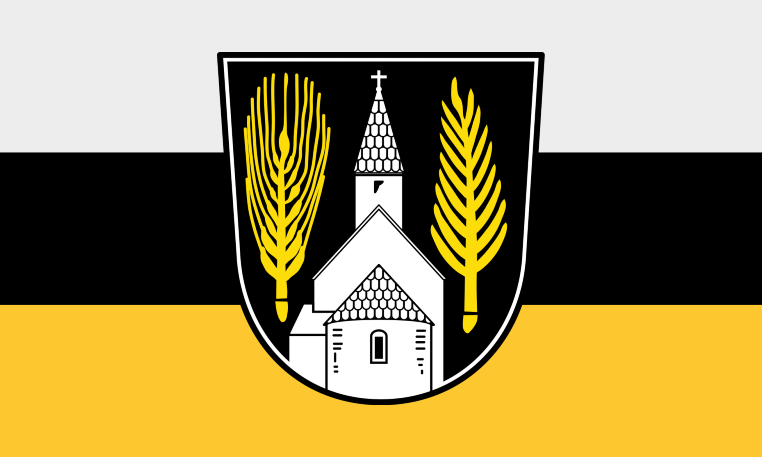
- Flag Coat of arms

- Location of Edelsfeld within Amberg-Sulzbach district
- Interactive map of Edelsfeld
- Location within Germany Location within Bavaria
- Coordinates: 49°34′N 11°42′E
- Country: Germany
- State: Bavaria
- Admin. region: Oberpfalz
- District: Amberg-Sulzbach
- Subdivisions: 26 Ortsteile

Government
  - Mayor (2020–26): Hans-Jürgen Strehl (FW)

Area
  - Total: 34.71 km^{2} (13.40 sq mi)
- Elevation: 528 m (1,732 ft)

Population (2025-12-31)
  - Total: 2,009
  - Density: 57.88/km^{2} (149.9/sq mi)
- Time zone: UTC+01:00 (CET)
  - Summer (DST): UTC+02:00 (CEST)
- Postal codes: 92265
- Dialling codes: 09665
- Vehicle registration: AS
- Website: www.edelsfeld.de

Edelsfeld (German pronunciation: [ˈeːdl̩sˌfɛlt]) is a municipality in the district of Amberg-Sulzbach in Bavaria, Germany.

== Geography ==
Apart from Edelsfeld the municipality consists of the following villages:

- Alternsthof
- Bernricht
- Birkhof
- Boden
- Eberhardsbühl
- Gassenhof
- Kalchsreuth
- Kleinalbershof
- Neuernsthof
- Neumühle
- Niederärndt
- Oberndorf
- Riglashof
- Schmalnohe
- Schnellersdorf
- Sigras
- Silbergrub
- Sinnleithen
- Steinling
- Stopfmühle
- Streitbühl
- Trosthof
- Vögelas
- Wegscheid
- Weißenberg
