= Ybbsitz =

- Municipality
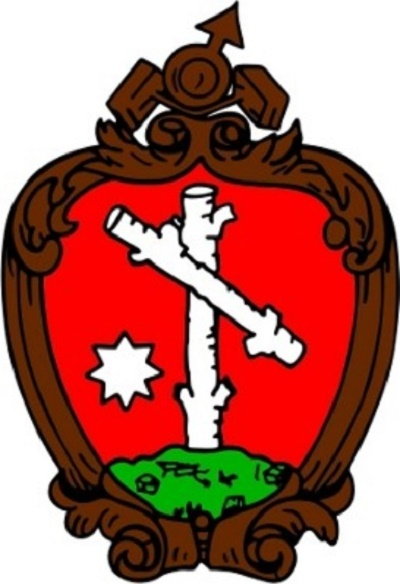
- Coat of arms

- Location within Austria
- Coordinates: 47°57′N 14°53′E
- Country: Austria
- State: Lower Austria
- District: Amstetten

Government
  - Mayor: Gerhard Lueger

Area
  - Total: 104.19 km^{2} (40.23 sq mi)
- Elevation: 414 m (1,358 ft)

Population (2018-01-01)
  - Total: 3,445
  - Density: 33.06/km^{2} (85.64/sq mi)
- Time zone: UTC+1 (CET)
  - Summer (DST): UTC+2 (CEST)
- Postal code: 3341
- Area code: 07443
- Website: www.ybbsitz.at

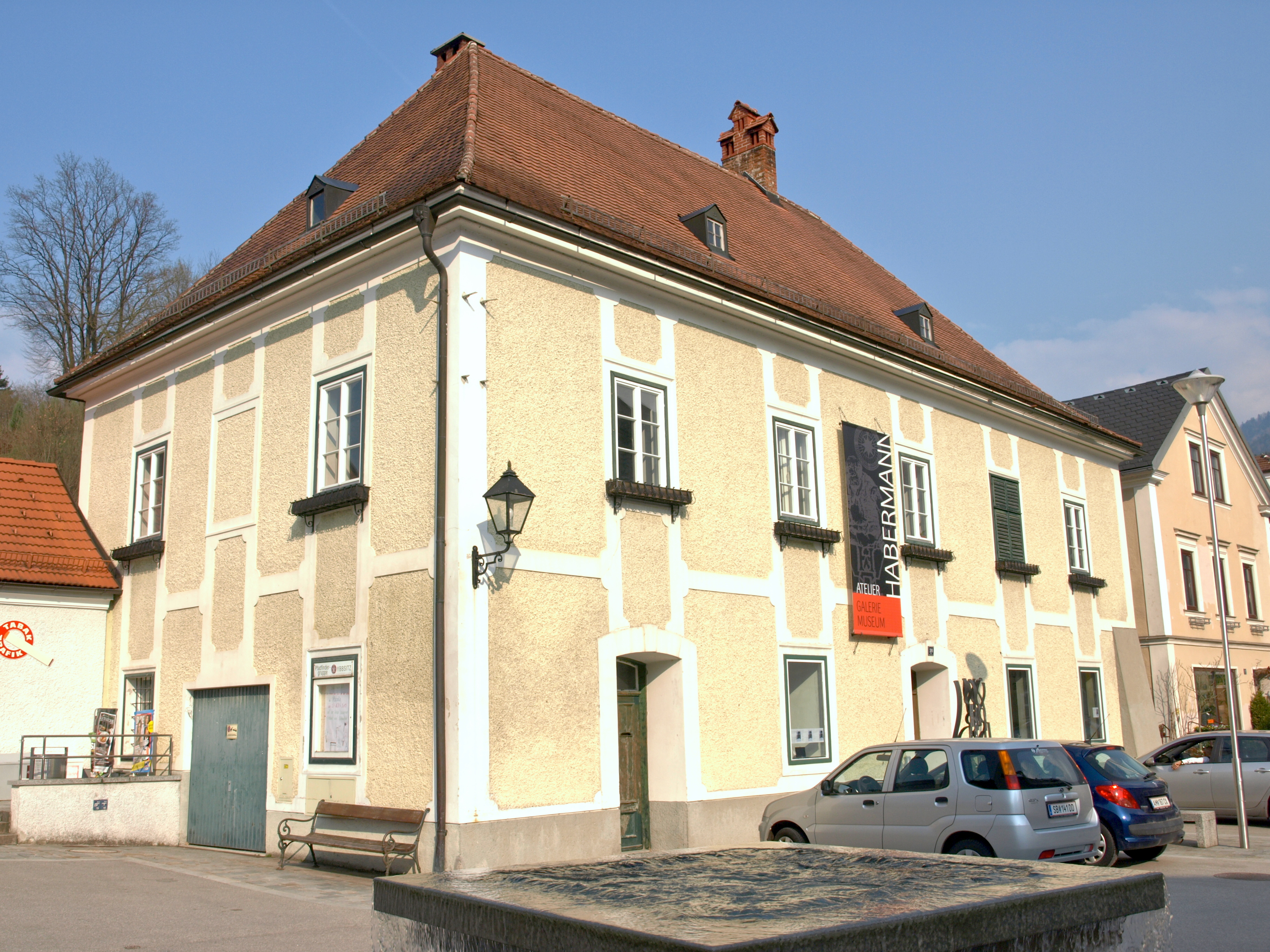
Former town hall

Ybbsitz is a town in the district of Amstetten in Lower Austria in Austria.

== Geography ==
Ybbsitz lies in the Mostviertel in Lower Austria.
