= Erzgebirge 4 =

State electoral district of Germany

15: Erzgebirge 4
- Electoral district for the Landtag of Saxony
- Erzgebirge 4 in 2024
- District: Erzgebirgskreis
- Electorate: 54,630 (2024)
- Major settlements: Annaberg-Buchholz, Ehrenfriedersdorf, Geyer, Jöhstadt, Oberwiesenthal, Scheibenberg, Schlettau, and Thum

Current electoral district
- Party: AfD
- Member: Thomas Prantl

Erzgebirge 4 is an electoral constituency (German: Wahlkreis) represented in the Landtag of Saxony. It elects one member via first-past-the-post voting. Under the constituency numbering system, it is designated as constituency 15. It is within the district of Erzgebirgskreis.

== Geography ==
The constituency comprises the towns of Annaberg-Buchholz, Ehrenfriedersdorf, Geyer, Jöhstadt, Oberwiesenthal, Scheibenberg, Schlettau, and Thum, and the districts of Bärenstein, Crottendorf, Gelenau, Königswalde, Mildenau, Sehmatal, Tannenberg, and Thermalbad Wiesenbad within Erzgebirgskreis.

There were 54,630 eligible voters in 2024.

== Members ==
Election	Member	Party	%
2014	Ronny Wähner	CDU	46.9
2019	Ronny Wähner	CDU	35.6
2024	Thomas Prantl	AfD	42.6

== Election results ==
=== 2024 election ===
State election (2024): Erzgebirge 4
Notes:	Blue background denotes the winner of the electorate vote. Pink background denotes a candidate elected from their party list. Yellow background denotes an electorate win by a list member, or other incumbent. A ✓ or ✗ denotes status of any incumbent, win or lose respectively.						
Party	Candidate	Votes	%	±%	Party votes	%	±%
AfD	Thomas Prantl	17,347	42.6	▲9.5	15,536	38.0	▲6.2
CDU	✗ Ronny Wähner	14,150	34.7	▼0.8	13,555	33.2	▼2.6
BSW	Willy Frost	3,913	9.6		4,799	11.7	
FW	Madelaine Vogt	2,256	5.5	▼4.9	1,433	3.5	▼2.4
SPD	Gregor Neumann	1,352	3.3	▼1.4	1,632	4.0	▼2.0
Freie Sachsen					1,102	2.7	
Left	Frederic Beck	972	2.4	▼6.6	830	2.0	▼6.2
Greens	Nathalie Senf	509	1.2	▼1.9	591	1.4	▼1.8
APT					347	0.8	
PARTEI					236	0.6	▼0.4
Bündnis C					224	0.5	
FDP	Jens Schmitt	264	0.6	▼3.6	197	0.5	▼2.9
Values					126	0.3	
BD					85	0.2	
Pirates					51	0.1	
dieBasis					42	0.1	
V-Partei3					38	0.1	
ÖDP					17	0.0	
BüSo					12	0.0	
Informal votes		552			462		
Total valid votes		40,763			40,853		
Turnout		41,315	75.6	▲5.4			
AfD gain from CDU	Majority	3,197	7.9				

=== 2019 election ===
State election (2019): Erzgebirge 4
Notes:	Blue background denotes the winner of the electorate vote. Pink background denotes a candidate elected from their party list. Yellow background denotes an electorate win by a list member, or other incumbent. A ✓ or ✗ denotes status of any incumbent, win or lose respectively.						
Party	Candidate	Votes	%	±%	Party votes	%	±%
CDU	✓ Ronny Wähner	13,705	35.6	▼11.3	13,813	35.7	▼10.1
AfD	Thomas Prantl	12,741	33.1		12,322	31.9	▲20.7
FW	Beate Großmann	4,015	10.4	▲3.4	2,302	6.0	▲3.2
Left	Antje Feiks	3,451	9.0	▼11.5	3,188	8.2	▼8.6
SPD	Sören Wittig	1,806	4.7	▼4.6	2,317	6.0	▼3.3
FDP	Enrico Wohlgemuth	1,624	4.2	▲0.1	1,309	3.4	Steady
Greens	Nino Haustein	1,199	3.1	▼0.5	1,268	3.3	▲0.5
APT					576	1.5	▲0.6
NPD					432	1.1	▼4.7
PARTEI					385	1.0	▲0.7
Verjüngungsforschung					214	0.6	
The Blue Party					131	0.3	
Pirates					102	0.3	▼0.3
ÖDP					87	0.2	
Awakening of German Patriots - Central Germany					75	0.2	
PDV					56	0.1	
Humanists					42	0.1	
BüSo					21	0.1	Steady
DKP					15	0.0	
Informal votes		675			561		
Total valid votes		38,541			38,655		
Turnout		39,216	68.1	▲15.7			
CDU hold	Majority	964	2.5	▼23.9			

=== 2014 election ===
State election (2014): Erzgebirge 4
Notes:	Blue background denotes the winner of the electorate vote. Pink background denotes a candidate elected from their party list. Yellow background denotes an electorate win by a list member, or other incumbent. A ✓ or ✗ denotes status of any incumbent, win or lose respectively.						
Party	Candidate	Votes	%	±%	Party votes	%	±%
CDU	Ronny Wähner	14,595	46.9		14,332	45.8	
Left		6,370	20.5		5,258	16.8	
AfD					3,516	11.2	
SPD		2,885	9.3		2,901	9.3	
NPD		2,241	7.2		1,811	5.8	
FW		2,168	7.0		862	2.8	
FDP		1,271	4.1		1,054	3.4	
Greens		1,111	3.6		862	2.8	
APT					275	0.9	
Pirates		463	1.5		183	0.6	
PARTEI					107	0.3	
Pro Germany Citizens' Movement					83	0.3	
DSU					36	0.1	
BüSo					26	0.1	
Informal votes		755			553		
Total valid votes		31,104			31,306		
Turnout		31,859	52.4	▼9.7			
CDU win new seat	Majority	8,225	26.4				

== See also ==
- Politics of Saxony
- Landtag of Saxony
