= Matthias Hoë von Hoënegg =

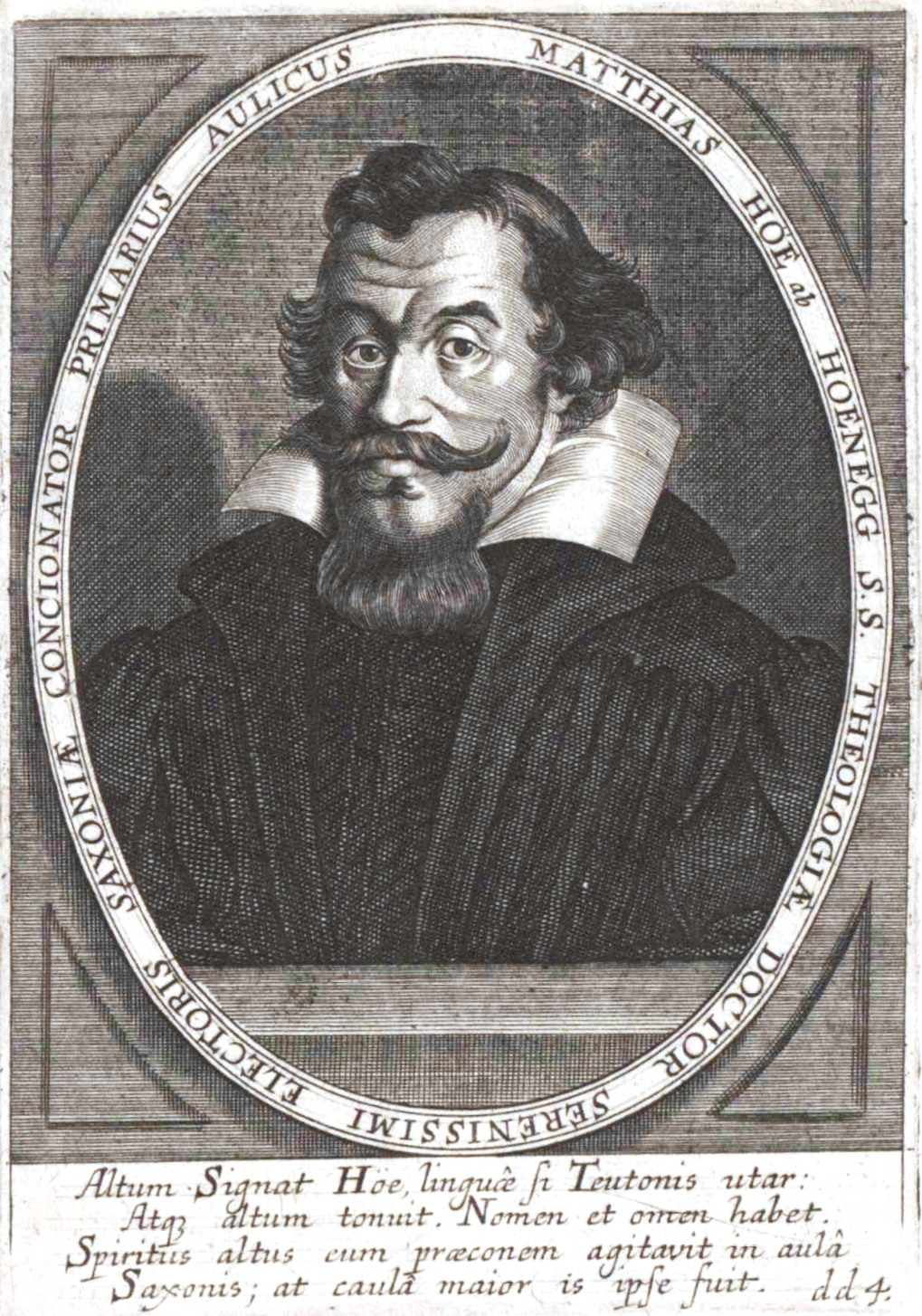
- Born: 24 February 1580; Vienna, Austria
- Died: 4 March 1645 (aged 65); Dresden, Saxony
- Education: University of Vienna, University of Wittenberg
- Occupation: Lutheran pastor
- Known for: Chief court preacher of Saxony, strong Lutheran polemics
- Notable work: Commentarii in Joannis Apocalypsin (Leipzig 1610/40)
- Father: Leonhard Höe von Höenegg

Matthias Hoë von Hoënegg (24 February 1580, in Vienna – 4 March 1645, in Dresden) was a German Lutheran pastor.

== Life ==
Matthias's father was Leonhard Höe von Höenegg, a Lutheran imperial councillor and doctor of law descended from old Austrian nobility. Matthias was born prematurely and so his health was weak during his early years, meaning he only started speaking when he was seven. His father initially had him taught by a private tutor until, once he was almost fully educated, he was allowed to visit Vienna's St Stephan's Stadtschule, where he developed remarkably and began talking to the city's scholars.

Due to the imminent capture of Vienna in 1594 by the Ottomans, Matthias, his father and his brother moved to Steyr, where they spent three years and where Matthias attended the local gymnasium. His father then returned to Vienna and recalled Matthias, giving him a chance to attend the University of Vienna, where he initially studied philosophy. On the recommendation of an envoy from Saxony, on 16 June 1597 he moved to the University of Wittenberg, where he studied philosophy and gained his master's degree, toying with going into law but in the end deciding to study theology.

After several disputations and lectures in Wittenberg, his father's death in 1599 brought him back to Vienna for a short time, before returning to Wittenberg, where he gained his licentiate in theology in 1601. In 1602 he travelled to Dresden, where he aimed to become court-preacher to the Prince Elector. After a trial sermon on 17 February 1602 he gained the post and also graduated on 6 March 1604 as a doctor of theology in Wittenberg. Christian II of Saxony then sent him to Plauen as superintendent, where on 20 April he was introduced to Polykarp Leyser the Elder.

Despite several offers of other posts, he remained in the service of Saxony and in 1611, at the request of the elector of Saxony, moved to Prague as director of Protestant schools and churches in Bohemia. He then moved back to Dresden on the death of Paul Jenisch and replaced him as chief court preacher of Saxony.

His most notable work is his two-volume Commentarii in Joannis Apocalypsin (Leipzig 1610/40). His sermons and writings were strong Lutheran polemics against the Reformed churches, whose beliefs he loathed more than Counter-Reformation Catholicism. Older literature on the topic has overestimated his influence on John George I of Saxony and Saxon policy at the start of the Thirty Years' War, though he was on John George's privy council when it approved siding with the Emperor against Frederick V and wrote propaganda to support that decision.

== Bibliography ==
- (in German) Frank Müller: Kursachsen und der böhmische Aufstand 1618–1622. Münster 1997, ISBN 3-402-05674-7.
- (in German) Christian Gottlieb Jöcher: Gelehrtenlexikon. Vol 2 p. 1638
- (in German) Wolfgang Sommer: Die lutherischen Hofprediger in Dresden: Grundzüge ihrer Geschichte und … Franz Steiner, 2006, ISBN 3-515-08907-1
- Adolf Brecher: Hoë von Hoënegg, Matthias. In: Allgemeine Deutsche Biographie (ADB). Vol 12, Duncker & Humblot, Leipzig 1880, S. 541–549.
- "Matthias Hoë von Hoënegg". Biographisch-Bibliographisches Kirchenlexikon (BBKL) (in German).
- "Entry". Zedlers Universallexikon. Vol. 13. p. 184.
