= Thomas Prantl =

German politician (born 1974)

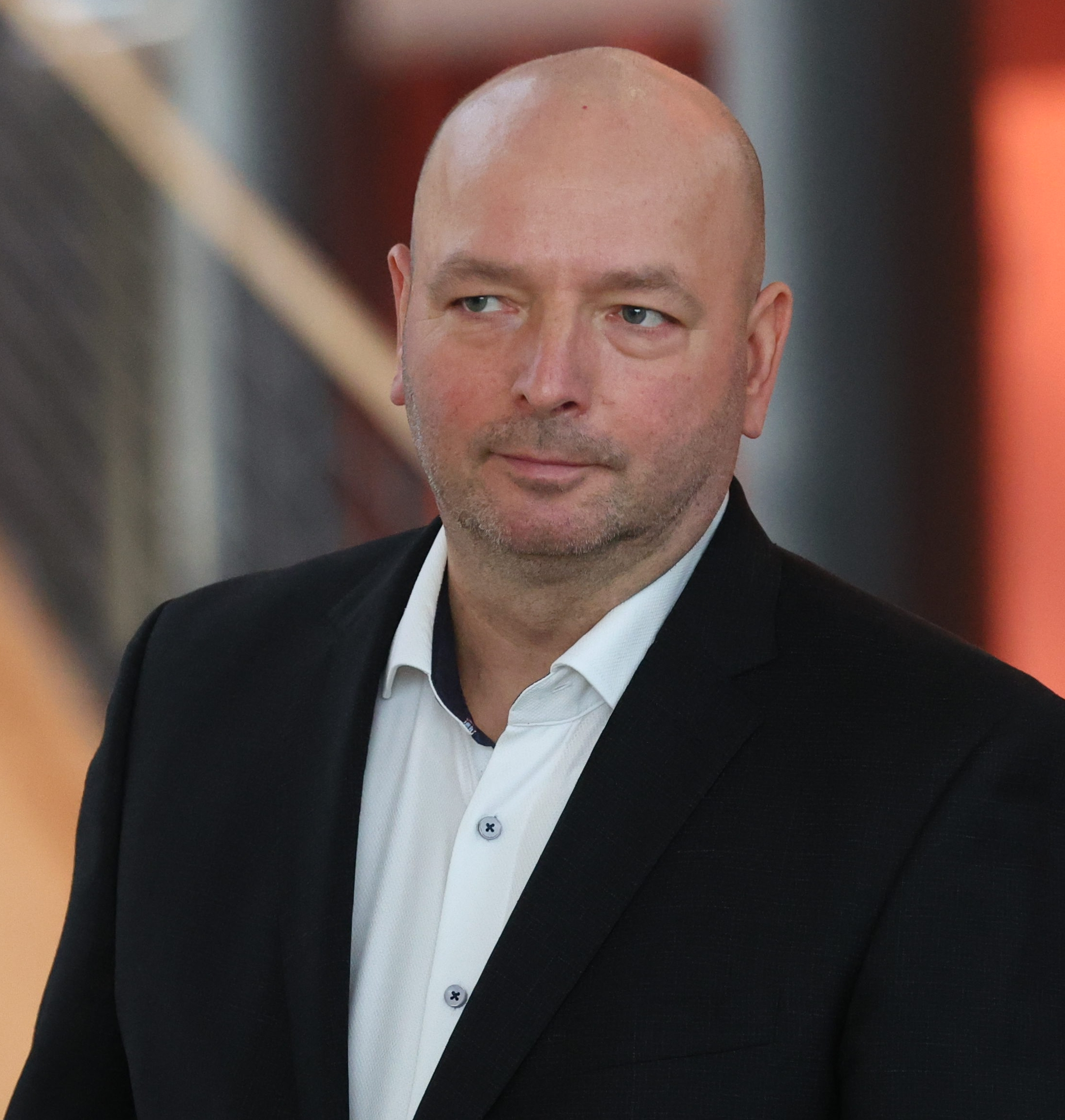
- Prantl in 2024

Member of the Landtag of Saxony
- Incumbent
- Assumed office 1 October 2019
- Constituency: Erzgebirge 4 (2024–present)

Personal details
- Born: 1974 (age 51–52) Annaberg-Buchholz
- Party: Alternative for Germany (since 2016)

Thomas Prantl (born 1974 in Annaberg-Buchholz) is a German politician serving as a member of the Landtag of Saxony since 2019. He has served as group leader of the Alternative for Germany in the city council of Annaberg-Buchholz since 2019.
