= Barbara Uthmann =

German bobbin lace businesswoman (c. 1514–1575)

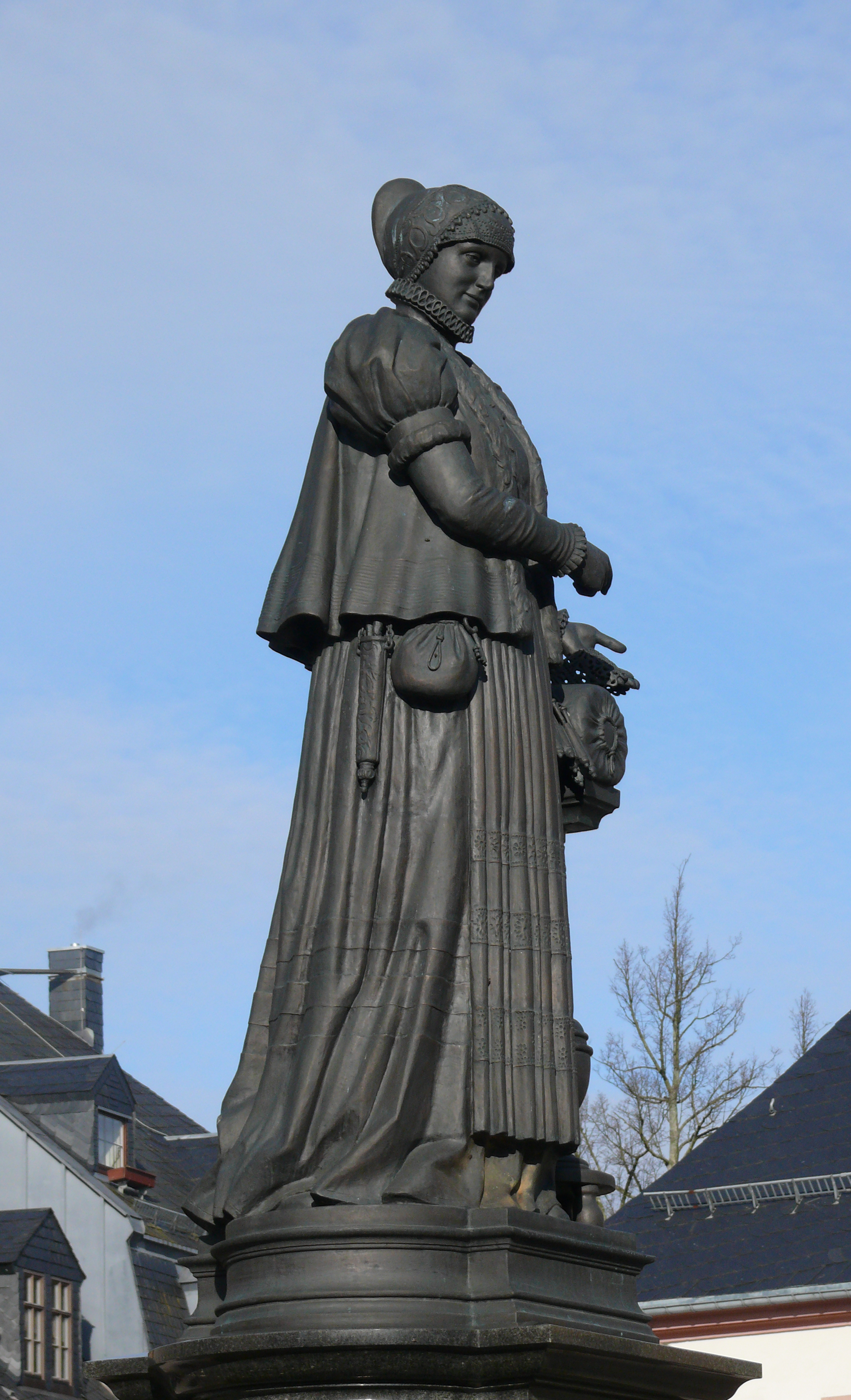
The Barbara Uthmann Fountain in Annaberg-Buchholz

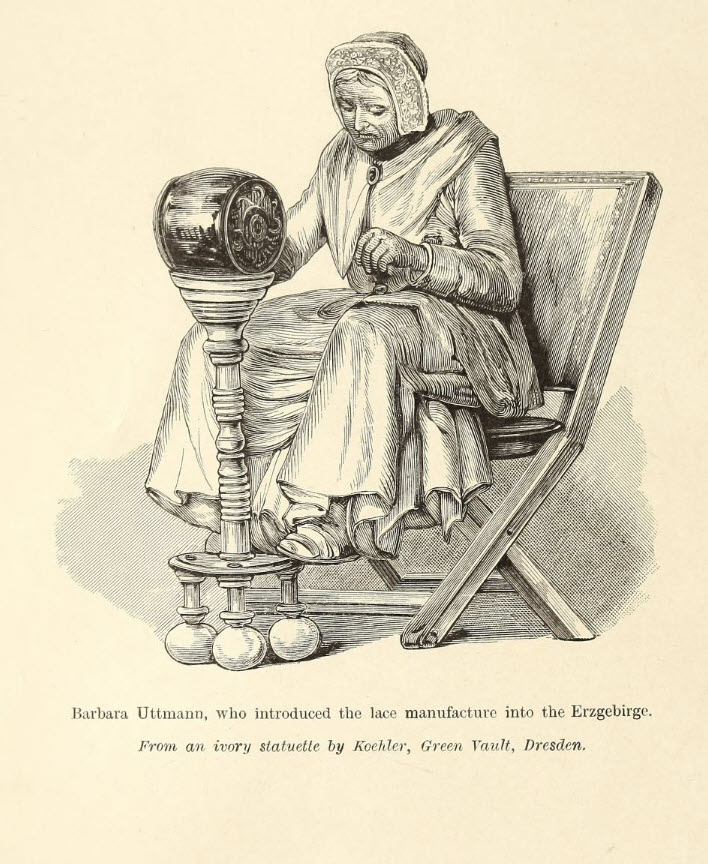
Image of Barbara Uttmann or Uthmann, German lace entrepreneur

Barbara Uthmann (born around 1514 in Annaberg in the Ore Mountains in Germany; died 14 January 1575, also in Annaberg) was considered to be one of the greatest supporters of bobbin lace making (probably incorrectly, as explained by Reinhart Unger in his work, Barbara Uthmann und ihre Zeit) and was a successful businesswoman in the Ore Mountains. Her last name has sometimes been spelled Uttmann, but the spelling Uthmann is generally considered to be correct today.

== Life ==
She was the daughter of Heinrich von Elterlein and successfully continued the business of her deceased husband, Christoph Uthmann, but failed as a result of intrigue by her competition. She was thus forced to look for another field of activity. It cannot be historically proven that she actually had bobbin lace made as a cottage industry (commonly referred to as manufacturing at that time), but it can be proven that she was active as a manufacturer of braids. At times, she employed 900 braid makers. After her death, she left behind a considerable life's work and is still counted today as one of the extraordinary personalities of the Ore Mountains.

== Monuments to Barbara Uthmann ==
- In 1885, a bronze figure of Uthmann was cast for the town of Annaberg by the Dresden sculptor, Professor Eduard Robert Henze. It served as an acknowledgement to Barbara Uthmann, who was considered to be the instigator of the second industrial boom (after silver mining) in the history of the Ore Mountains.
- In the second half of the 1930s, a child died while playing at the edge of the Barbara Uthmann fountain and the water was removed from the pool. It was filled with earth and planted afterwards.
- In the Second World War, the bronze figure was melted down for armaments production (30 July 1942).
- On 12 November 1998, after two polls, it was decided that the Barbara Uthmann monument should be erected again. After collecting donations for ten years, a replica of the Henze monument was erected in the market square at Annaberg-Buchholz on 2 October 2002. On this occasion, the Uthmann family celebrated a family reunion in Annaberg-Buchholz. Over 60 descendants witnessed the official opening of the fountain and signed the golden book of the town.
- There is also a Barbara-Uthmann monument in the market square of Elterlein.

== Honours ==
In 2003, the minor planet 1998 CA, discovered on 1 February 1998 at Drebach Observatory in the Ore Mountains, was named after Barbara Uthmann. The asteroid, which is now officially called 31231 Uthmann, orbits the sun between the planets of Mars and Jupiter.

== Continue reading ==
- Hastedt, Regina (1987). Barbara Uthmann: Historischer Roman [Barbara Uthmann: Historical Novel] (in German). Greifenverlag Rudolstadt.
- Lorenz, Wolfgang; Unger, Reinhard; Lange, Hermann (2002). Barbara Uthmann und ihre Familie: Eine Sammlung von Aufsätzen zum Wirken der Barbara Uthmann [Barbara Uthmann and her Family: a collection of essays on the works of Barbara Uthmann] (in German). Annaberg-Buchholz: Adam-Ries-Bund. ISBN 3-930430-56-8.
- Mehnert, Joachim (2005). Barbara Uthmann: eine ungewöhnliche Frau (in German). Tauchaer Verlag. ISBN 3-89772-104-X.
