= Ronny Wähner =

German politician (born 1975)

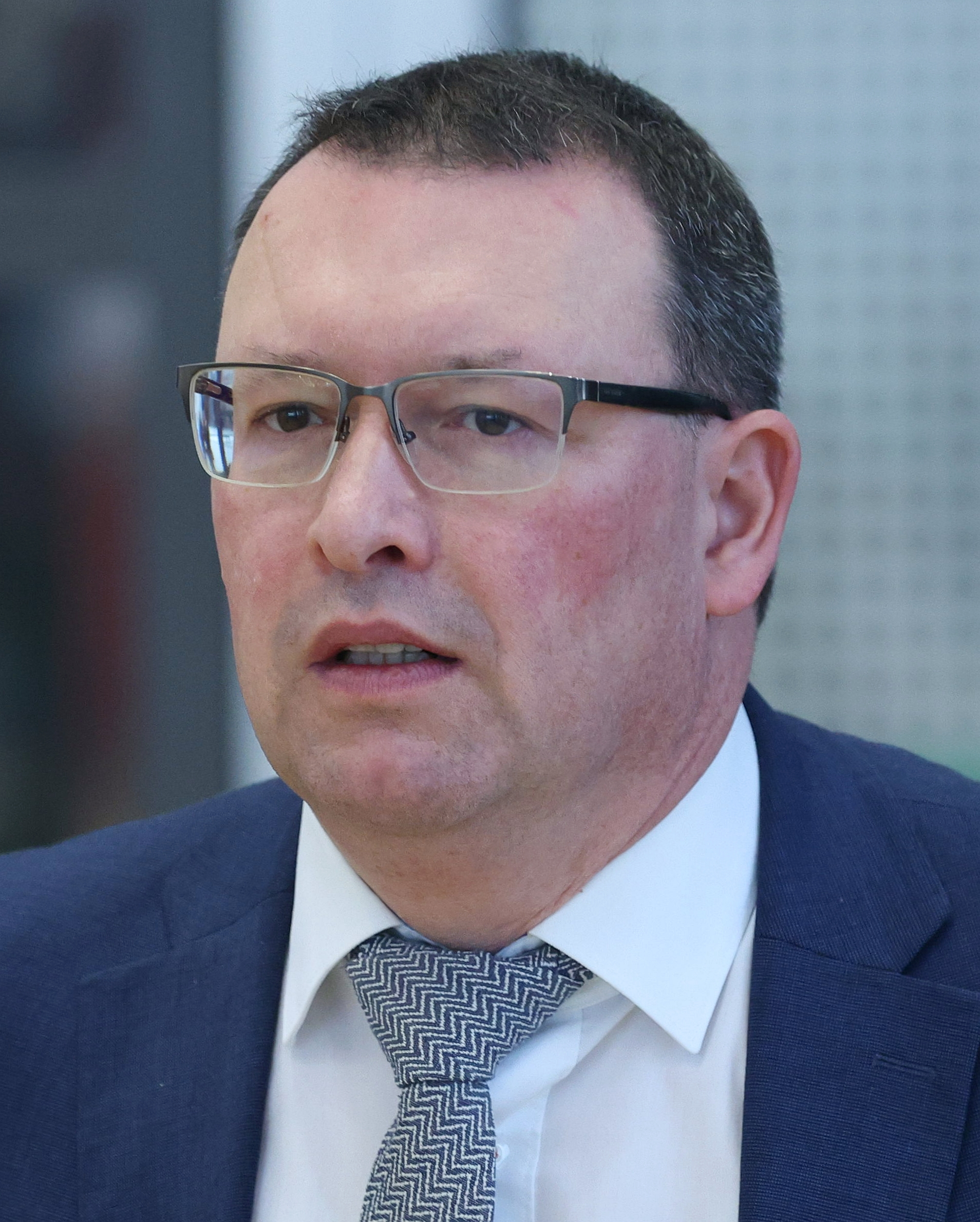
- Wähner in 2024

Member of the Landtag of Saxony
- Incumbent
- Assumed office 29 September 2014
- Preceded by: Steffen Flath
- Constituency: Erzgebirge 4

Personal details
- Born: 30 June 1975 (age 51) Annaberg-Buchholz
- Party: Christian Democratic Union (since 2001)

Ronny Wähner (born 30 June 1975 in Annaberg-Buchholz) is a German politician serving as a member of the Landtag of Saxony since 2014. He has served as mayor of Königswalde since 2013.
