= Königswalde =

- Municipality
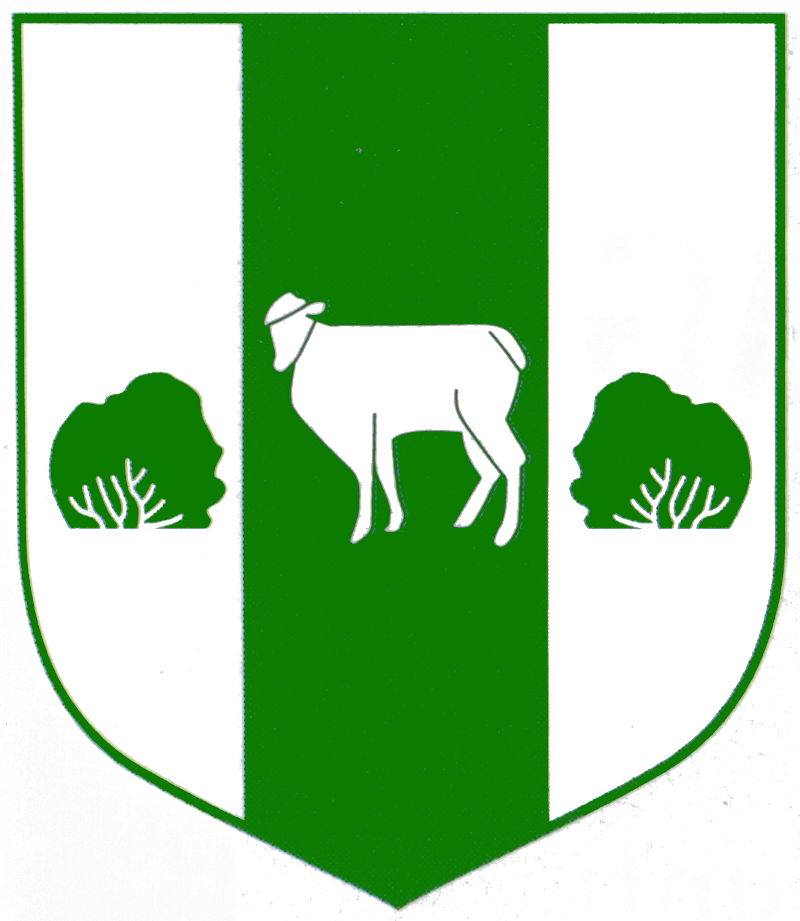
- Coat of arms

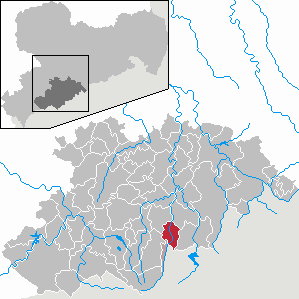
- Location of Königswalde within Erzgebirgskreis district
- Interactive map of Königswalde
- Location within Germany Location within Saxony
- Coordinates: 50°32′48″N 13°2′50″E
- Country: Germany
- State: Saxony
- District: Erzgebirgskreis
- Subdivisions: 2

Government
  - Mayor (2020–27): Ronny Wähner (CDU)

Area
  - Total: 19.51 km^{2} (7.53 sq mi)
- Elevation: 537 m (1,762 ft)

Population (2025-12-31)
  - Total: 2,037
  - Density: 104.4/km^{2} (270.4/sq mi)
- Time zone: UTC+01:00 (CET)
  - Summer (DST): UTC+02:00 (CEST)
- Postal codes: 09471
- Dialling codes: 03733
- Vehicle registration: ERZ
- Website: www.koenigswalde.de

Königswalde is a municipality in the district of Erzgebirgskreis, in Saxony, Germany.

== History ==
From 1952 to 1990, Königswalde was part of the Bezirk Karl-Marx-Stadt of East Germany.

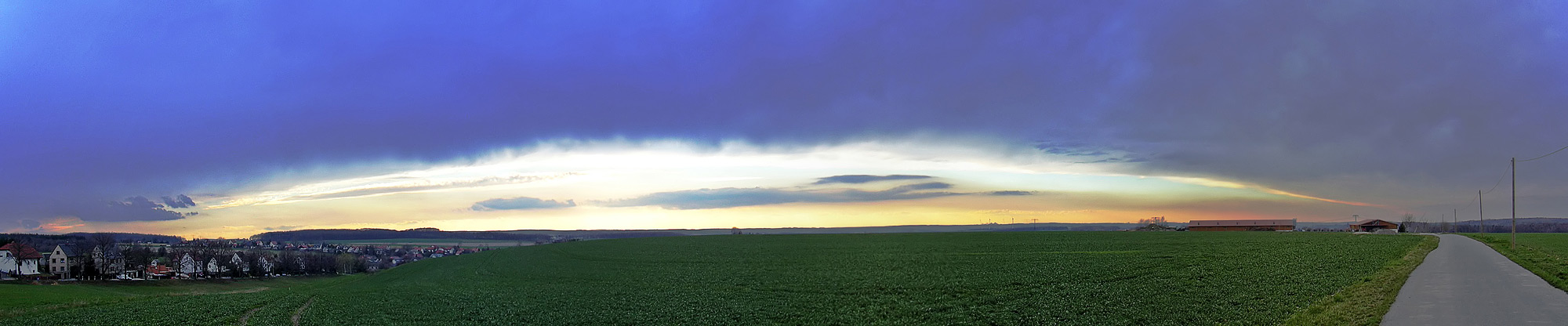
A sunset near Königswalde at Werdau

== Sources ==
- Schumann, August (1818). "Königswalde". Vollständiges Staats-, Post- und Zeitungslexikon von Sachsen (in German). Vol. 5. Zwickau. p. 11.
