= Annaberger Kät =

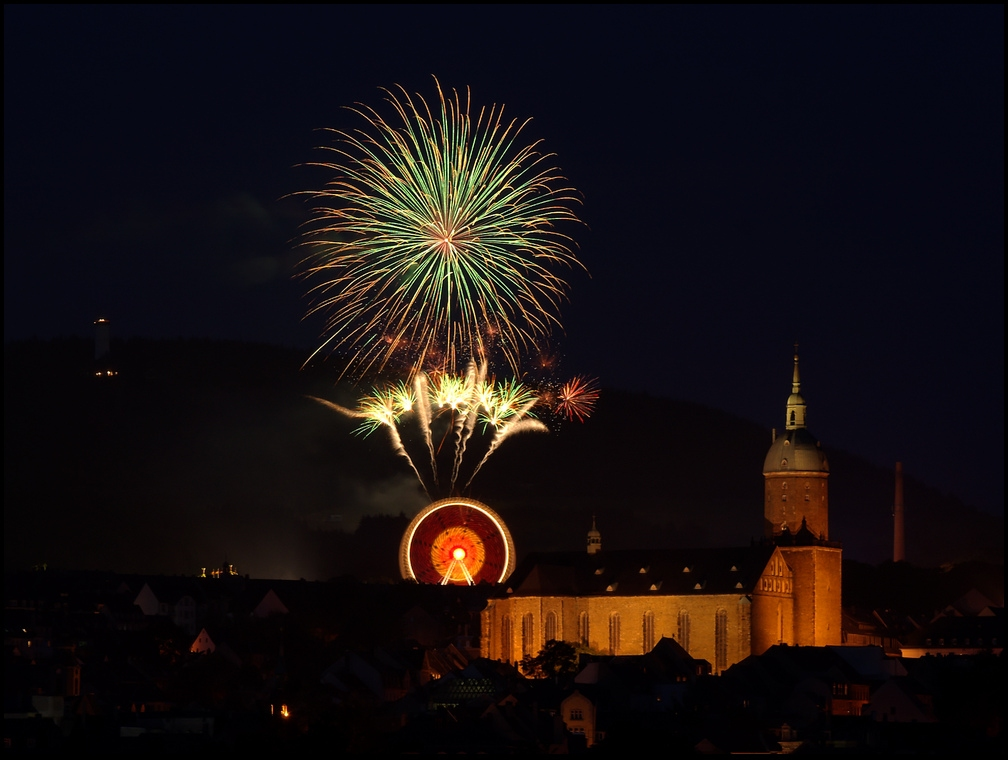
Fireworks at the 486th Annaberger Kät in 2006

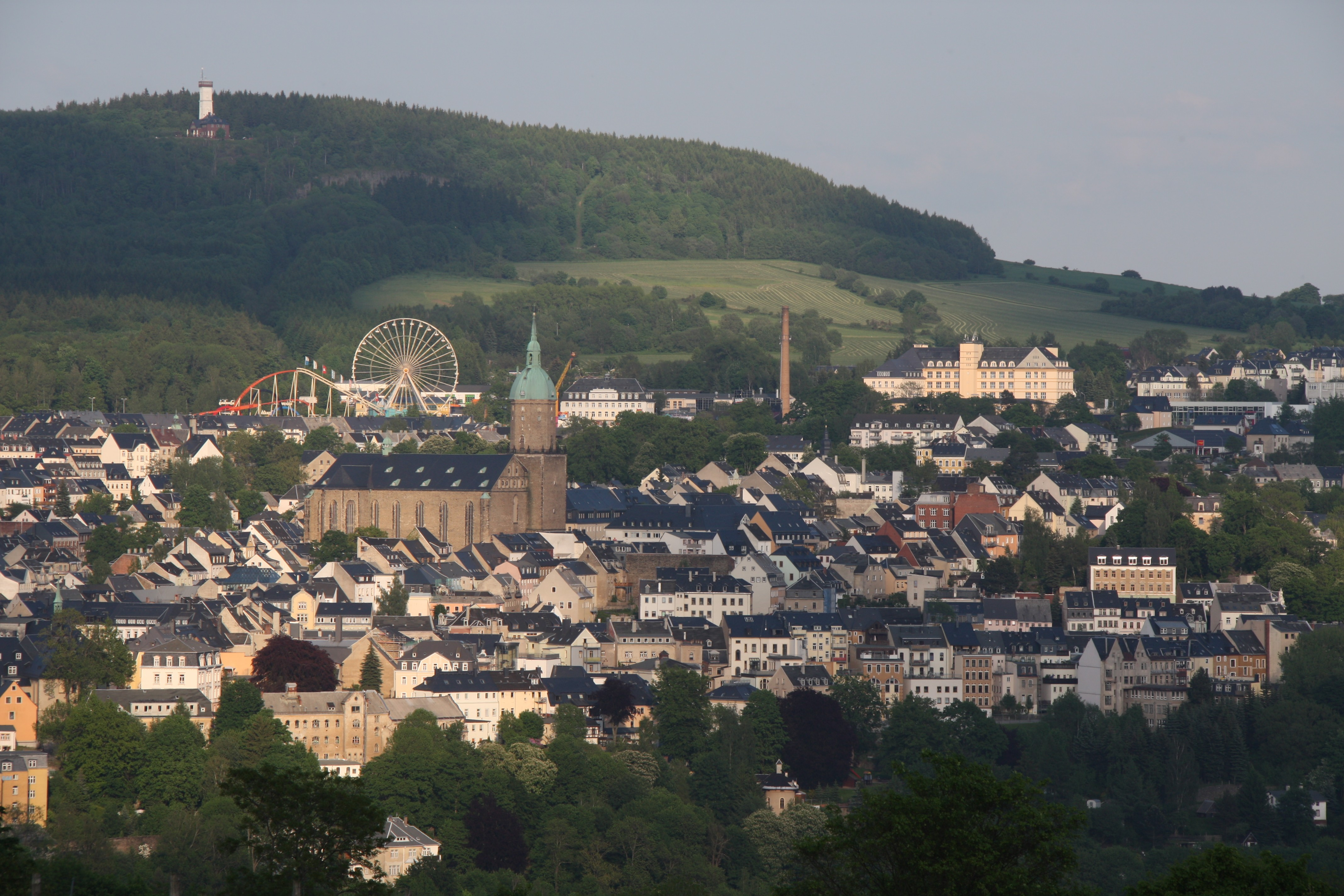
View of the town with ferris wheel and roller coaster (2010)

The Annaberger Kät (commonly called the Kät, pronounced "Kett") is the largest folk festival in the Ore Mountains and takes place annually for 14 days after Pentecost in the town of Annaberg-Buchholz in East Germany. It is one of the folk festivals in Germany, at which over 100 showmen perform their acts.

The Kät is known well outside the region and is one of the oldest folk festivals in Germany, having begun in 1520. It attracts over 150,000 visitors annually. The emphasis of the festival is more on shows and fairground rides rather than on food stalls and eating.
