= Schlettau =

- Town
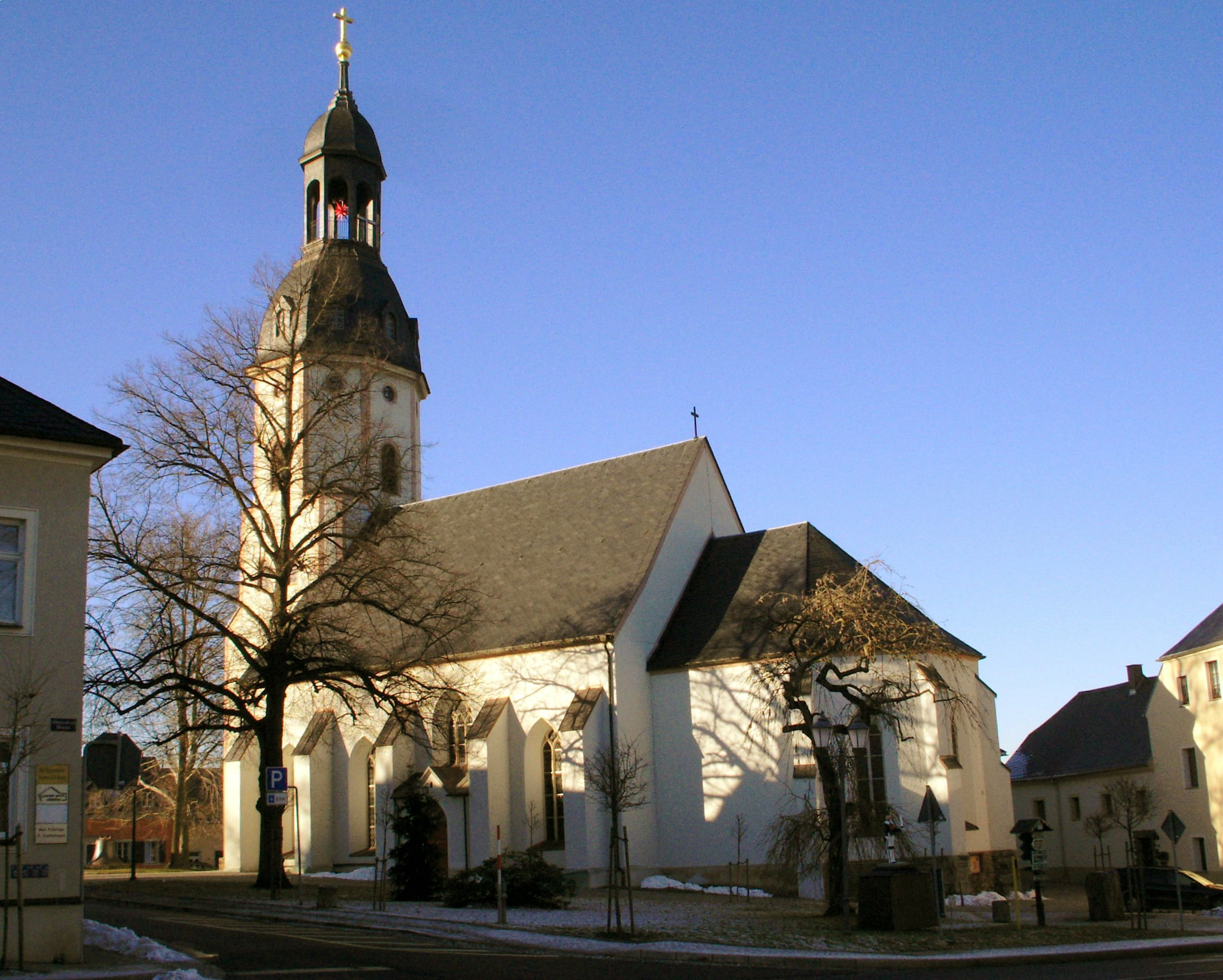
- Church in Schlettau

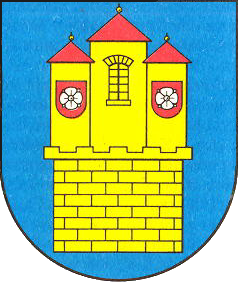
- Coat of arms

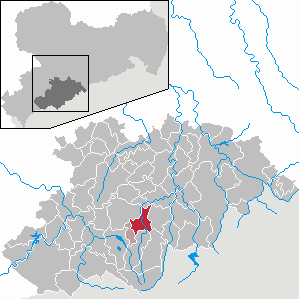
- Location of Schlettau within Erzgebirgskreis district
- Interactive map of Schlettau
- Location within Germany Location within Saxony
- Coordinates: 50°33′31″N 12°57′4″E
- Country: Germany
- State: Saxony
- District: Erzgebirgskreis

Government
  - Mayor (2022–29): Conny Göckeritz

Area
  - Total: 21.22 km^{2} (8.19 sq mi)
- Elevation: 612 m (2,008 ft)

Population (2025-12-31)
  - Total: 2,173
  - Density: 102.4/km^{2} (265.2/sq mi)
- Time zone: UTC+01:00 (CET)
  - Summer (DST): UTC+02:00 (CEST)
- Postal codes: 09487
- Dialling codes: 03733
- Vehicle registration: ERZ, ANA, ASZ, AU, MAB, MEK, STL, SZB, ZP
- Website: www.schlettau.de

Schlettau (German pronunciation: [ˈʃlɛtaʊ]) is a town in the district of Erzgebirgskreis, in Saxony in Germany. It is situated in the Ore Mountains, 5 km southwest of Annaberg-Buchholz, and 12 km east of Schwarzenberg.

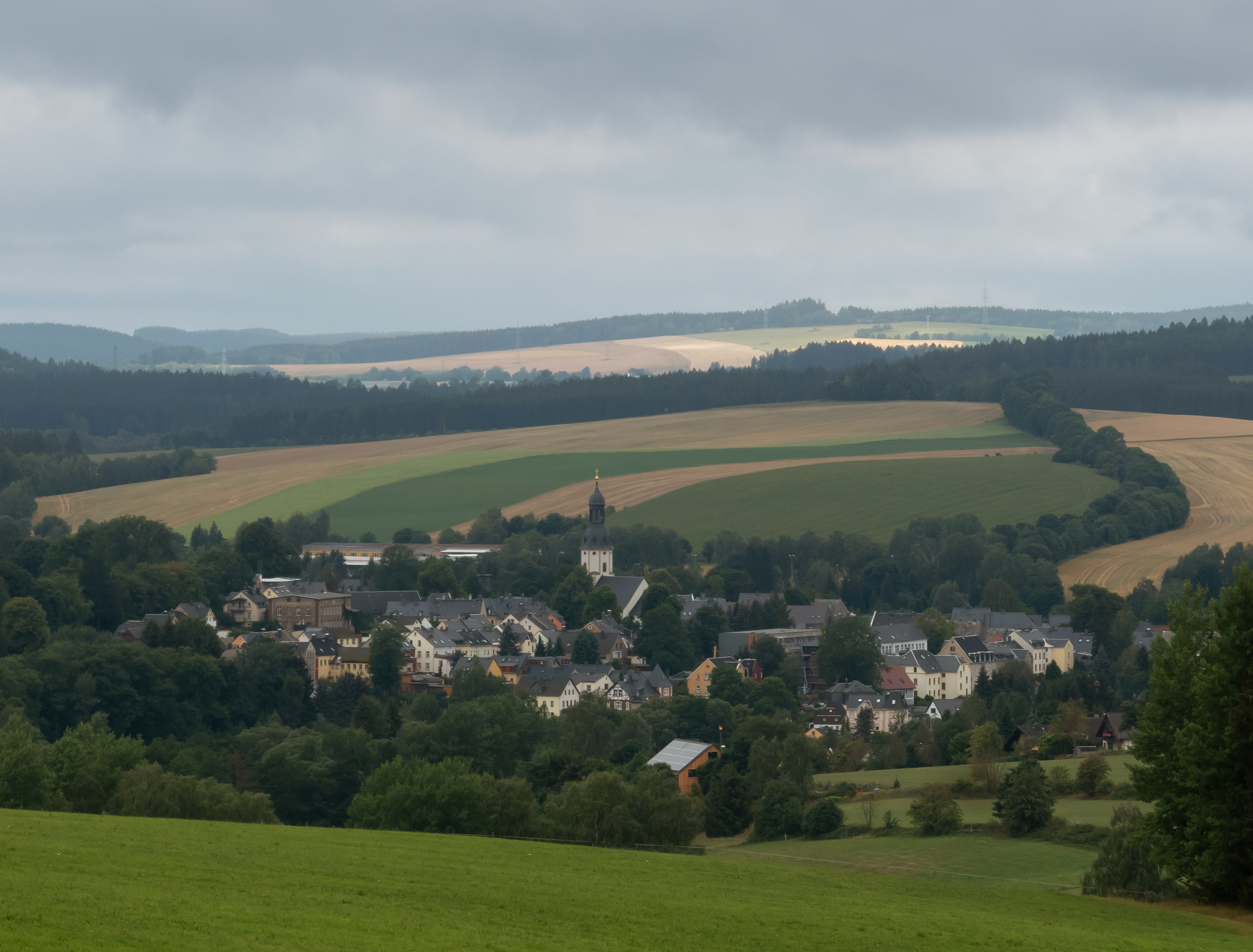
Schlettau, view to the town

== History ==
From 1952 to 1990, Schlettau was part of the Bezirk Karl-Marx-Stadt of East Germany.

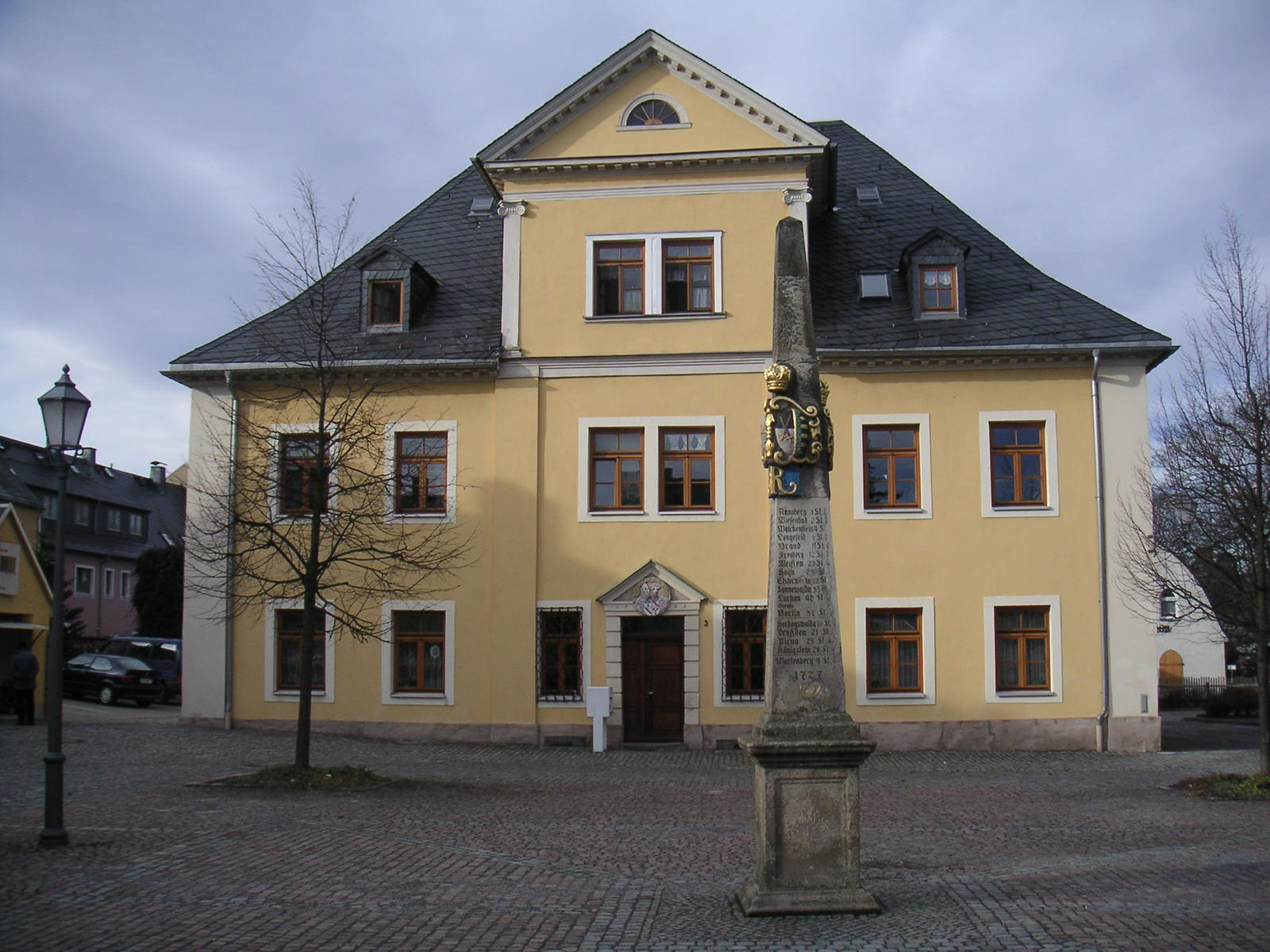
Reuther house

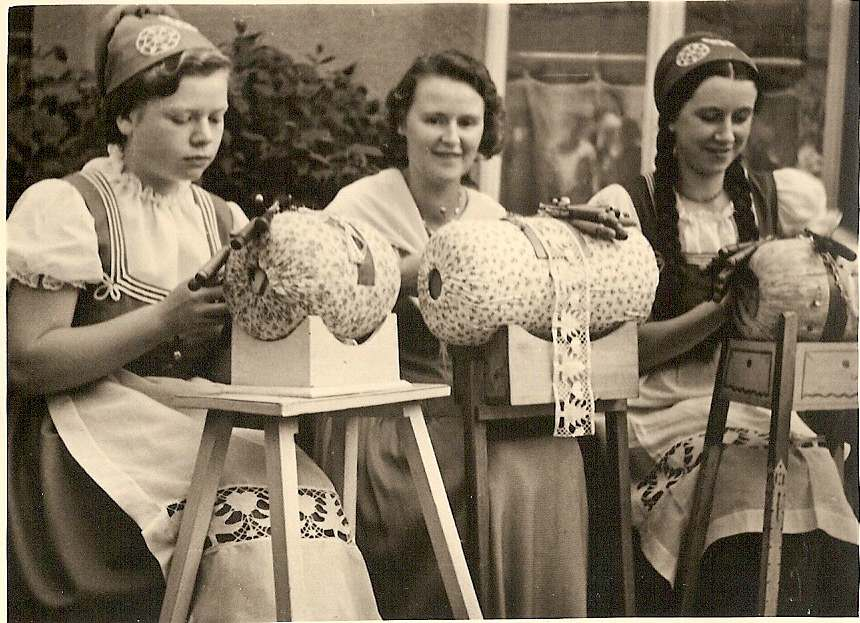
1936
