= Paul Jenisch =

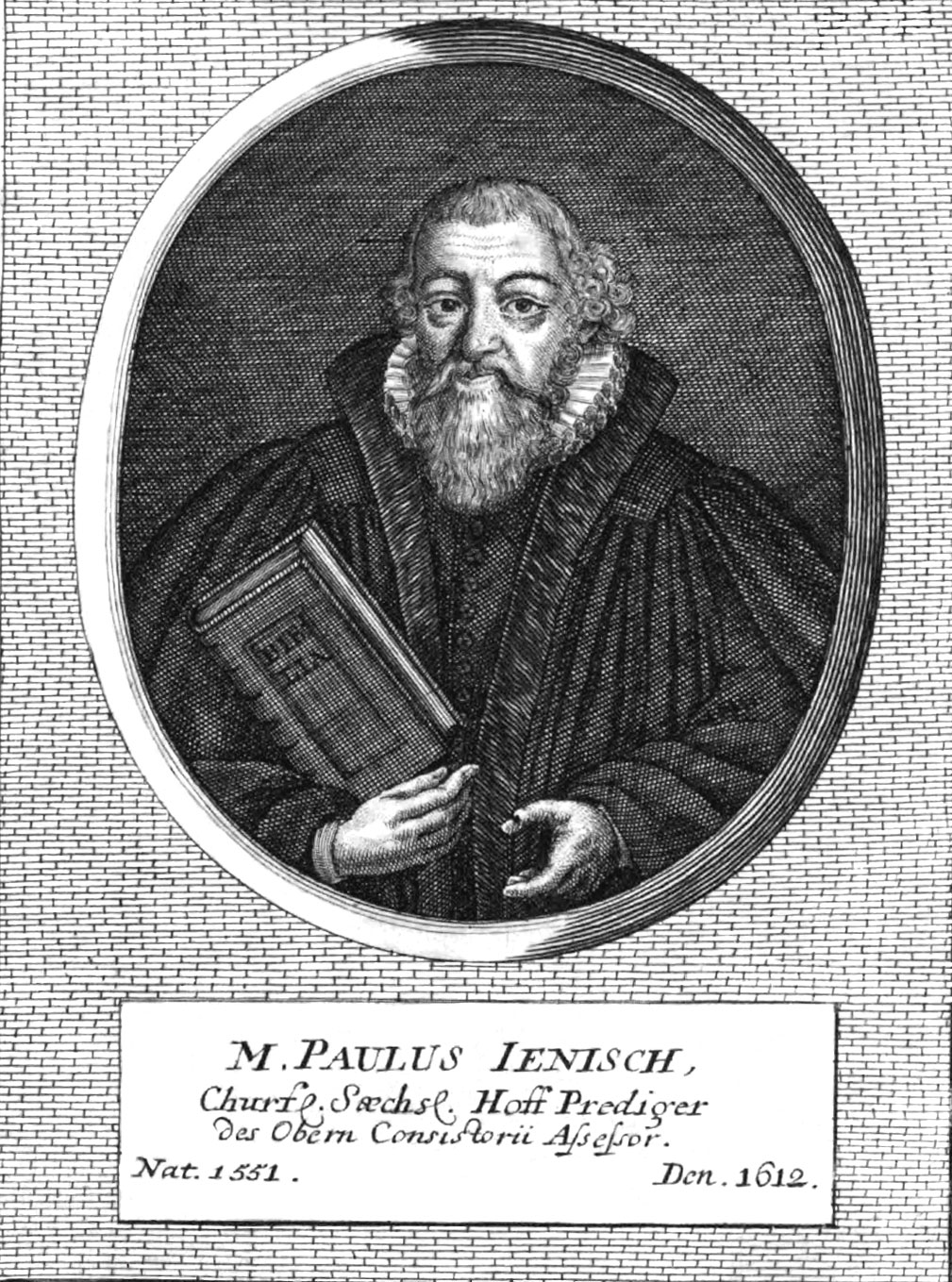
Paul Jenisch

Paul Jenisch, (also known as Paulus Jenisch, Jenisius or Jenischius; 1551 – 9 November 1612) was a German Lutheran pastor and academic.

== His career ==
Jenisch was born in Annaberg. In 1596 he became the superintendent of Eilenburg, and 1603 was the first chaplain of Dresden. In 1610 he became the preacher of Oberhof. He died in Dresden.

== Bibliography ==
- Fritz Roth: Restlose Auswertungen von Leichenpredigten und Personalschriften für genealogische und kulturhistorische Zwecke. Band 7, R 6841
- Reinhold Grünberg: Sächsische Pfarrer. Freiberg 1940
- Pfarrbuch Kirchenprovinz Sachsen. Band 4
- "Entry". Zedlers Universallexikon. Vol. 14. p. 205.
