= Annaberg-Buchholz =

Town in Saxony, Germany

- Town
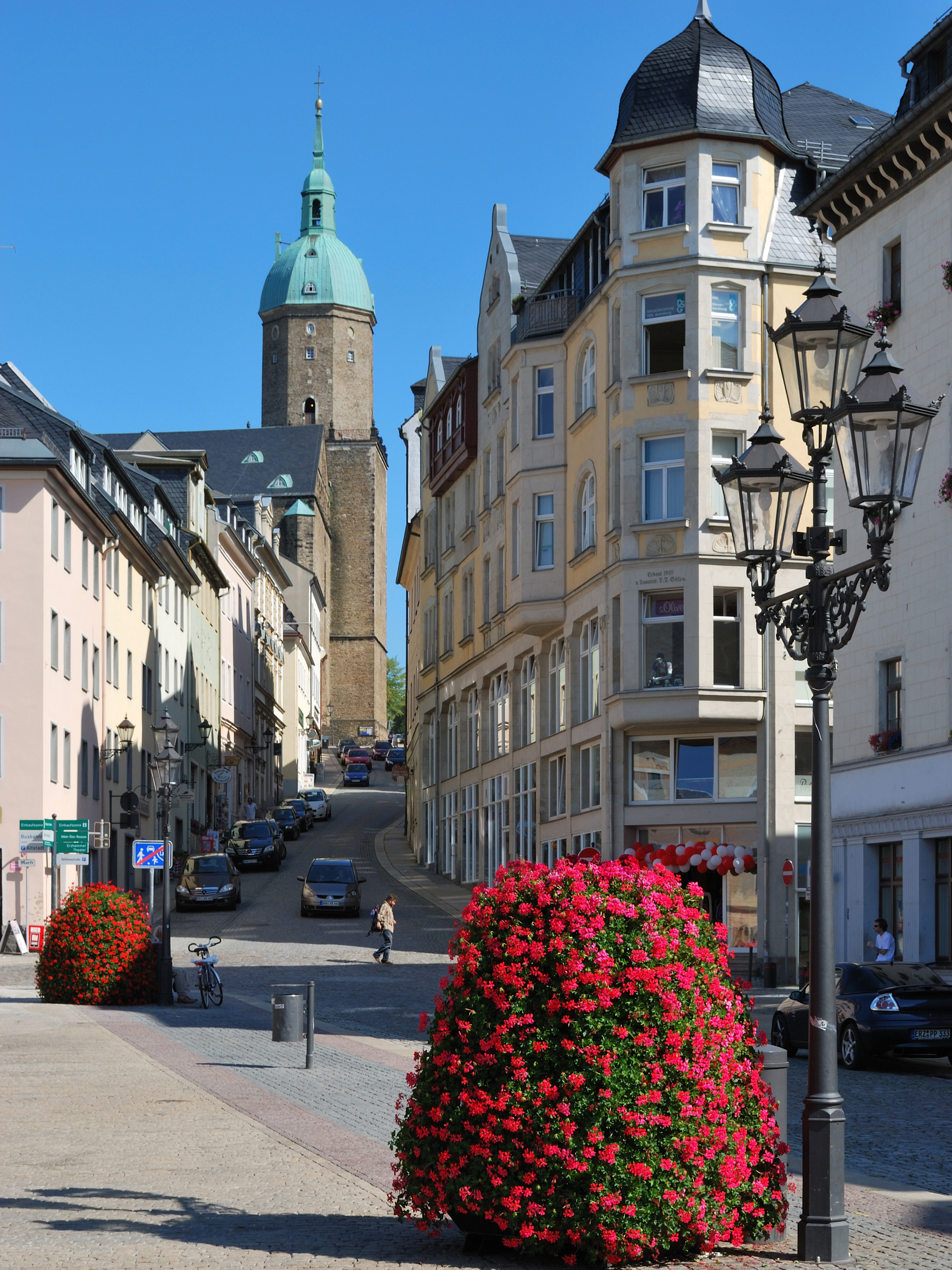

- Coat of arms

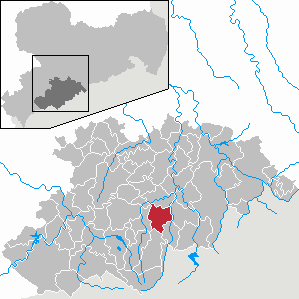
- Location of Annaberg-Buchholz within Erzgebirgskreis district
- Interactive map of Annaberg-Buchholz
- Location within Germany Location within Saxony
- Coordinates: 50°34′48″N 13°0′8″E
- Country: Germany
- State: Saxony
- District: Erzgebirgskreis

Government
  - Mayor (2022–29): Rolf Schmidt (FW)

Area
  - Total: 28.15 km^{2} (10.87 sq mi)
- Elevation: 600 m (2,000 ft)

Population (2025-12-31)
  - Total: 18,882
  - Density: 670.8/km^{2} (1,737/sq mi)
- Time zone: UTC+01:00 (CET)
  - Summer (DST): UTC+02:00 (CEST)
- Postal codes: 09456
- Dialling codes: 03733
- Vehicle registration: ERZ, ANA, ASZ, AU, MAB, MEK, STL, SZB, ZP
- Website: www.annaberg-buchholz.de

Annaberg-Buchholz (German pronunciation: [ˈanabɛʁk ˈbuːxhɔlts]) is a town in Saxony, in eastern Germany. Lying in the Ore Mountains, it is the capital of the district of Erzgebirgskreis.

== Geography ==
The town is located in the Ore Mountains, at the side of the Pöhlberg (832 meters or 2,730 feet above sea level).

== History ==
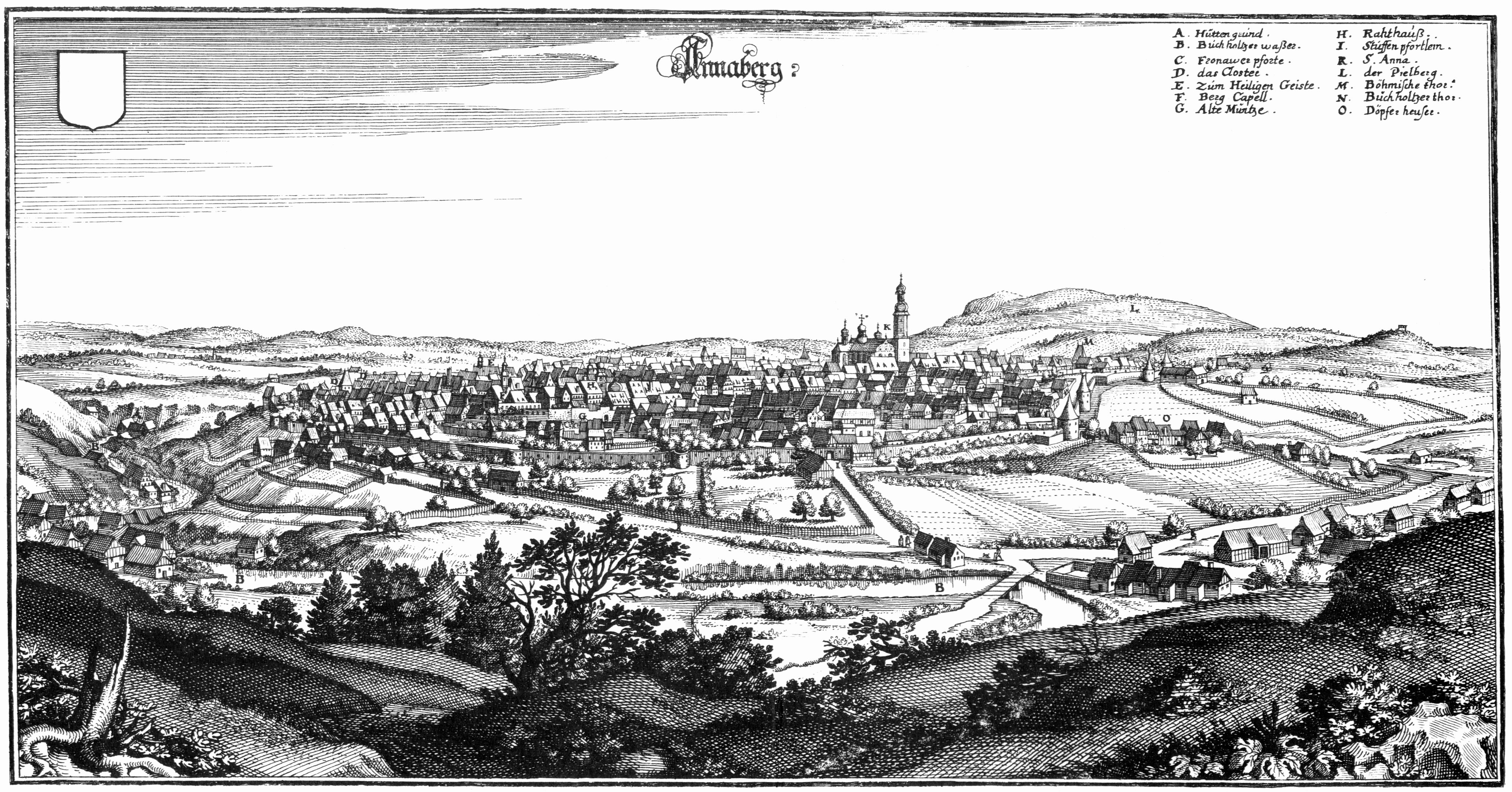
17th-century view of Annaberg

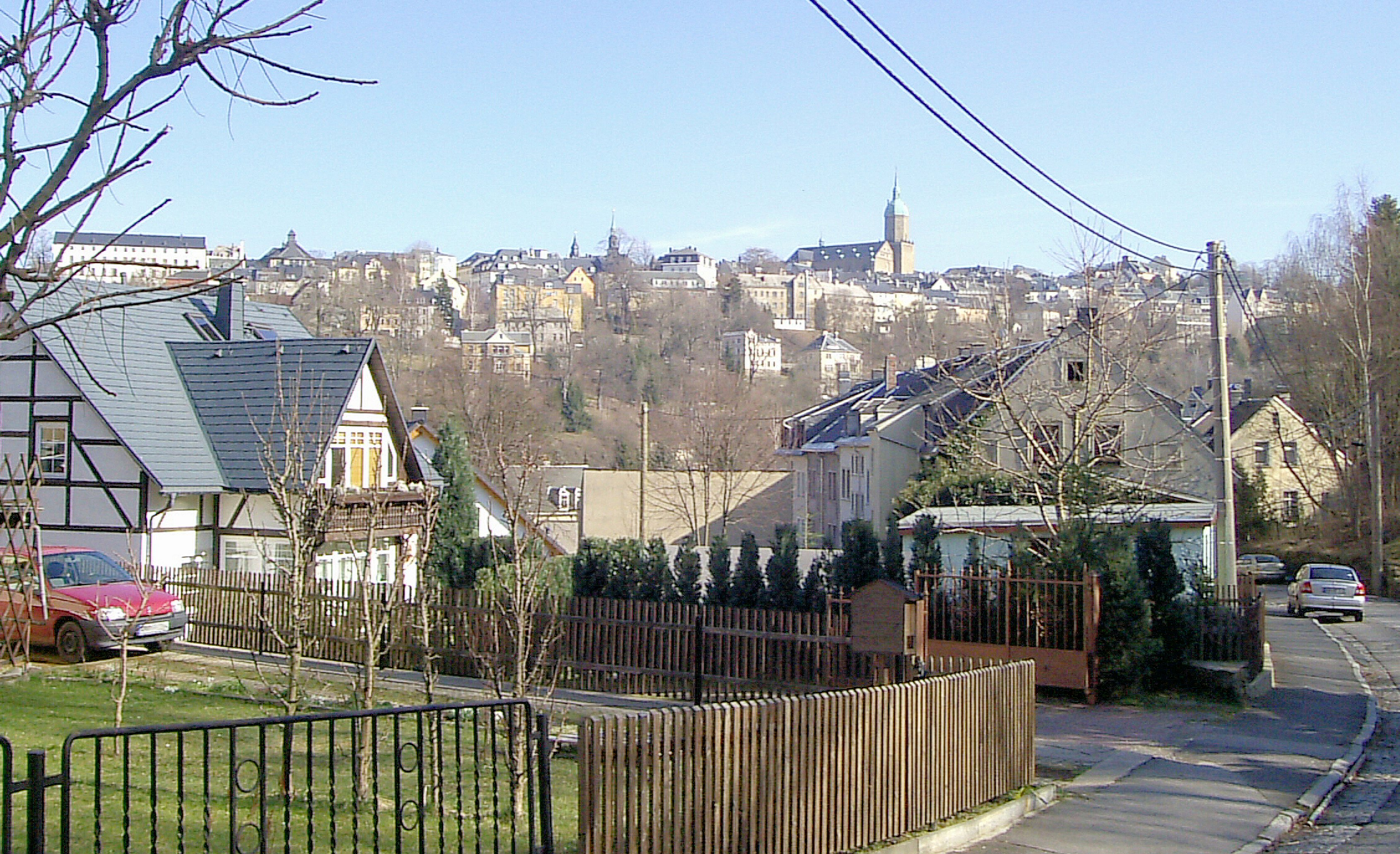
View of Annaberg

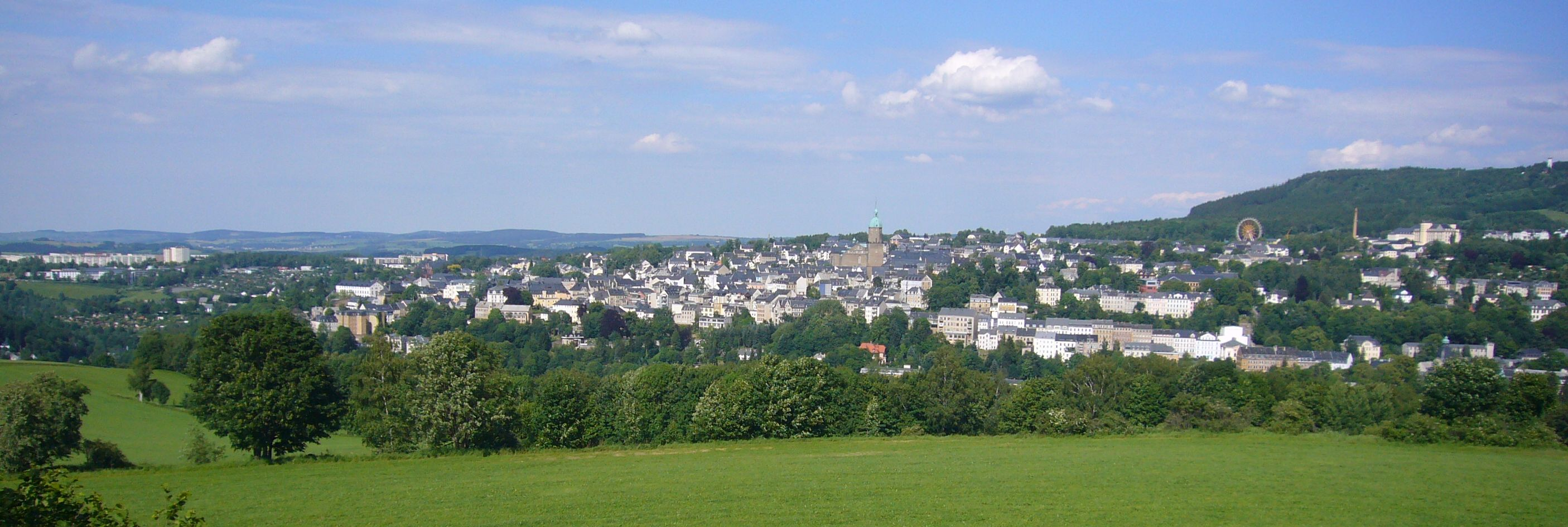
Annaberg from the west

The previously heavily forested upper Ore Mountains were settled in the 12th and 13th centuries by Franconian farmers. Frohnau, Geyersdorf, and Kleinrückerswalde—all now part of present-day town—have all been attested since 1397.

In 1491, silver deposits were discovered in the area, and Annaberg soon developed under the patronage of George, Duke of Saxony and Barbara Jagiellon. George and Barbara founded the landmark St. Anne's Church and a Franciscan monastery (dissolved in 1539), and Barbara donated a relic of Saint Anne to the church, which thus became a regional pilgrimage destination.

Barbara Uthmann introduced braid and lace-making to the town in 1561 and the craft was further developed in the 1590s by Belgian refugees fleeing the policies of Fernando Álvarez de Toledo, 3rd Duke of Alba, Spain's governor over the Low Countries. The industry was further developed in the 19th century, when Annaberg and Buchholz were connected by rail to Chemnitz and to each other, with both settlements having specialized schools for lace-making. The population of Annaberg in the 1870s was 11,693. This had risen to 16,811 by 1905, with another 9,307 in Buchholz.

The town's mines formerly produced silver, tin, and cobalt, but ceased production before the First World War. After the Reunification of Germany in 1989, some were restored for viewing by tourists.

In 1945, the two towns Annaberg and Buchholz merged into the new town Annaberg-Buchholz. From 1952 to 1990, Annaberg-Buchholz was part of the Bezirk Karl-Marx-Stadt of East Germany.

=== Historical population ===
At the start of the 16th Century, Annaberg was one of the largest towns in Germany with an estimated 8,000 inhabitants. In 1834 Annaberg had a population of 5,068 and Buchholz with 1,424. In 1875, 11,693 people lived in Annaberg, in 1890 11,725, in 1925 18,204, and in 1933 19,818. The figures in the table are for Annaberg-Buchholz.

Historical population (from 1960, on 31 December):

Pre-1945

- 1925: 27,123
- 1933: 28,868
- 1939: 28,225

1946–1981

- 1946: 27,651^{1}
- 1950: 36,660^{2}
- 1960: 29,012
- 1971: 27,508
- 1981: 26,664

1984–1999

- 1984: 26,236
- 1995: 23,920
- 1997: 23,177
- 1998: 25,098
- 1999: 24,679

2000–2009

- 2000: 24,495
- 2001: 24,103
- 2002: 23,680
- 2003: 23,387
- 2004: 23,147
- 2005: 23,043
- 2006: 22,808
- 2007: 22,514
- 2008: 22,348
- 2009: 22,079

2010–2019

- 2010: 22.079
- 2011: 21.831
- 2012: 21.604
- 2013: 20.826
- 2014: 20.510
- 2015: 20.394
- 2016: 20.426
- 2017: 20.426
- 2018: 20.000
- 2019: 19.769

2020–2029

- 2020: 19.619
- 2021: 19.393
- 2022: 19.118
- 2023: 19.382
- 2024: 19.470

Before 1945: Sum of population of towns Annaberg and Buchholz
Data source 1998: Statistical Office of Saxony

^{1} 29 October
^{2} 31 August

== Main sights ==
The area is a tourist destination and ski resort. The Ore Mountains are referred to as Land of Christmas and famous for the Christmas Markets and the carved sculptures. Annaberg has a Roman Catholic church and three Protestant churches, among them St. Anne's (built 1499-1525), which is the largest of its kind in Saxony. There are public monuments to Luther, the famous mathematician Adam Ries, and Barbara Uthmann. Buchholz had another Gothic Protestant church and monuments to Frederick the Wise and Bismarck. Annaberg is well known for its historical old town and market square; the house Markt 2 shows the coat of arms of the family Apian-Bennewitz.

=== Museums ===
- Adam Ries Museum and Annaberg School of Accountancy (Rechenschule)
- Ore Mountain Museum and Im Gößner visitor mine
- Manufaktur der Träume
- Markus-Röhling-Stolln visitor mine at Frohnau
- Dorothea-Stolln visitor mine at Cunersdorf

==== Frohnauer Hammer ====
The Frohnauer Hammer is a historic and fully working preserved hammer mill in the village of Frohnau within the municipality. In 1907, it was declared a technical monument and, since then, has been open to the public. In addition to the actual hammer mill itself, there is an exhibition of forged items and the former master hammersmith's house (Hammerherrenhaus).

=== Regular events ===
- An annual high point in early summer is the largest folk festival in the region, the Annaberger Kät.
- Every two years in August the Abbey Festival takes place in the ruins of Annaberg Abbey.
- The Annaberg Christmas Market is widely known outside the region and closes on the fourth week in advent with the world's biggest miners' parade (Bergparade).

== Twin towns – sister cities ==
Annaberg-Buchholz is twinned with:

- Chomutov, Czech Republic
- Paide, Estonia
- Weiden in der Oberpfalz, Germany

== Notable people ==
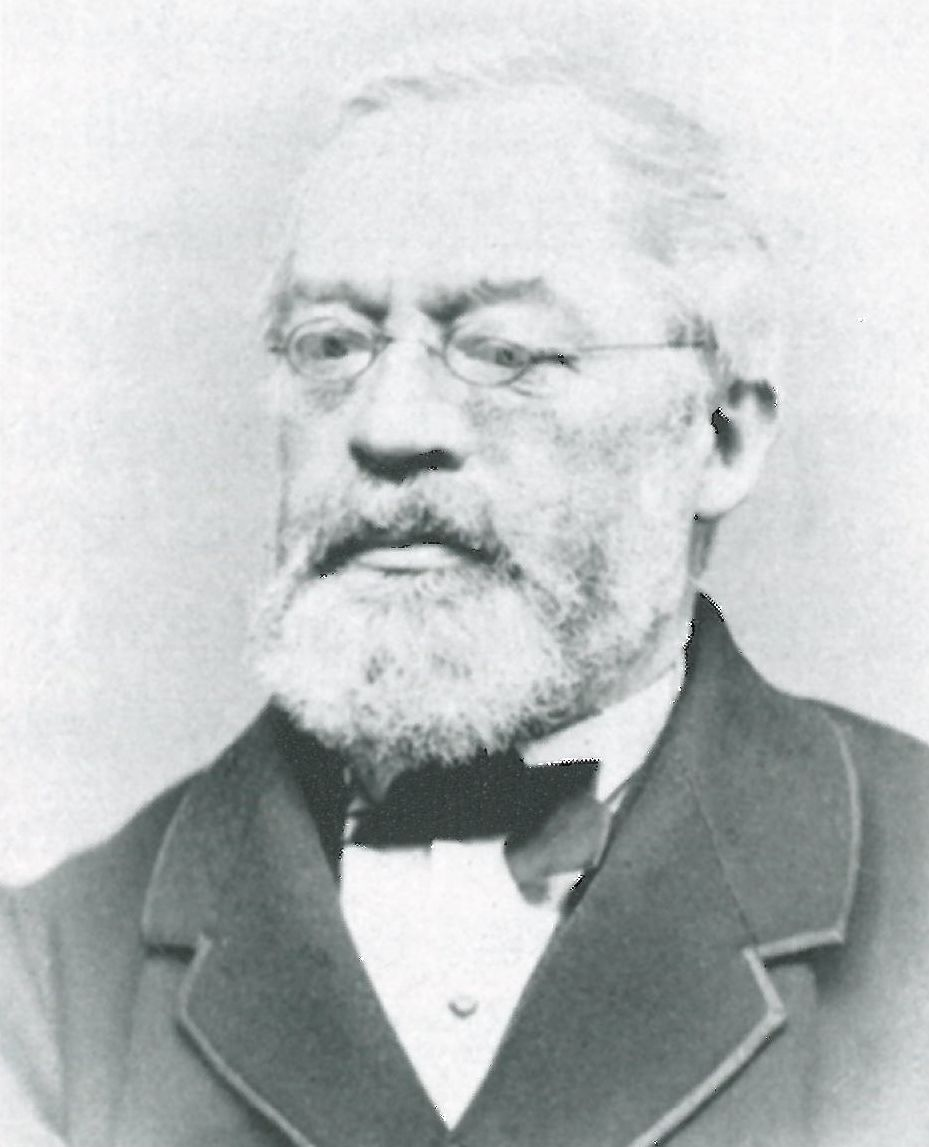
Bernhard Eisenstuck

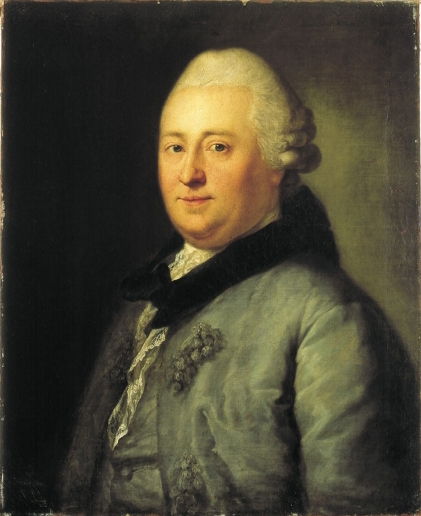
Christian Felix Weiße

- Gabriel Zwilling (1487–1558), Lutheran theologian and reformer
- Erasmus Sarcerius (1501-1559), Lutheran theologian and reformer
- Barbara Uthmann (1514–1575), born of Elterlein, entrepreneur
- Paul Jenisch (1551–1612), educator and theologian
- Gottfried Arnold Irenaeus called (1666–1714), poet
- Christian Felix Weiße (1726–1804), founder of the German Children's Literature
- Bernhard Eisenstuck (1805–1871), entrepreneur and politician
- Peter Gast alias Peter Guest (1854–1918), composer, writer, associate of Friedrich Nietzsche and dialect poet
- Theodor Korselt (1891–1943), lawyer and Nazi victim
- Frank Wiegand (born 1943), swimmer
- Matthias Herget (born 1955), football player
- Evelin Jahl (born 1956), discus thrower
- Ute Noack (born 1961), cross-country skier
- Yvonne Mai-Graham (born 1965), middle-distance runner
- Kathrin Weßel (born 1967), long-distance runner
- Thomas Prantl (born 1974), politician (AfD)
- Ronny Wähner (born 1975), German politician (CDU)
- Viola Bauer (born 1976), cross-country skier
- Anke Wischnewski (born 1978), luger
- Christel Loetzsch (born 1986), mezzo-soprano
- Eric Frenzel (born 1988), Nordic combined skier
- Felix Uduokhai (born 1997), professional footballer

== Gallery ==
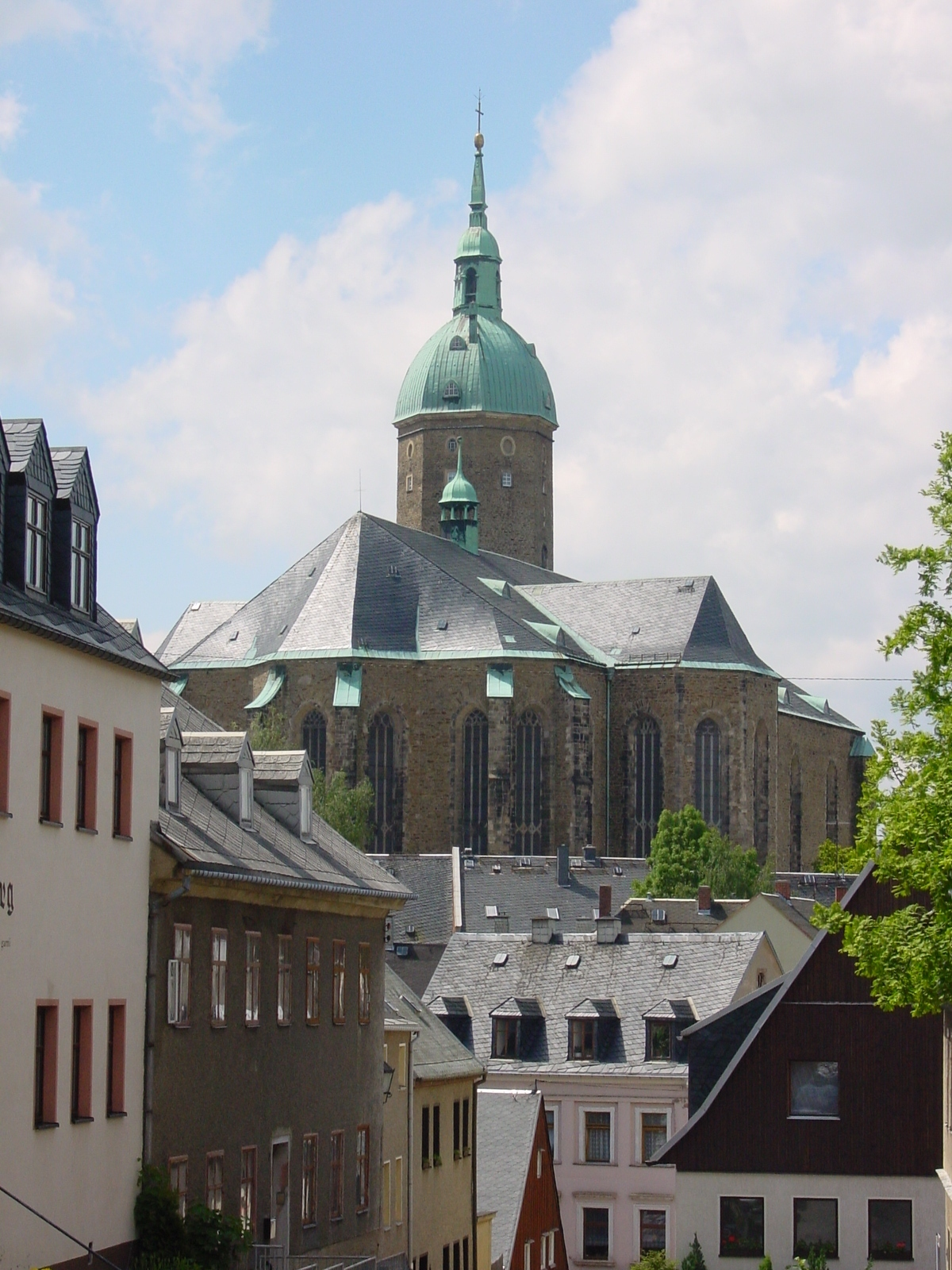
St. Anne's Church

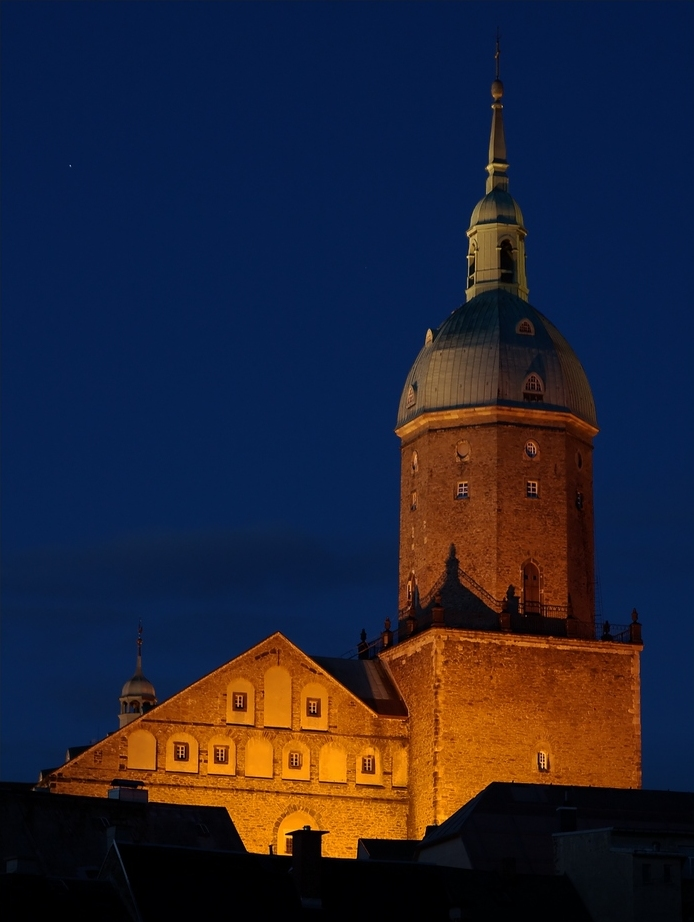
St. Anne's Church

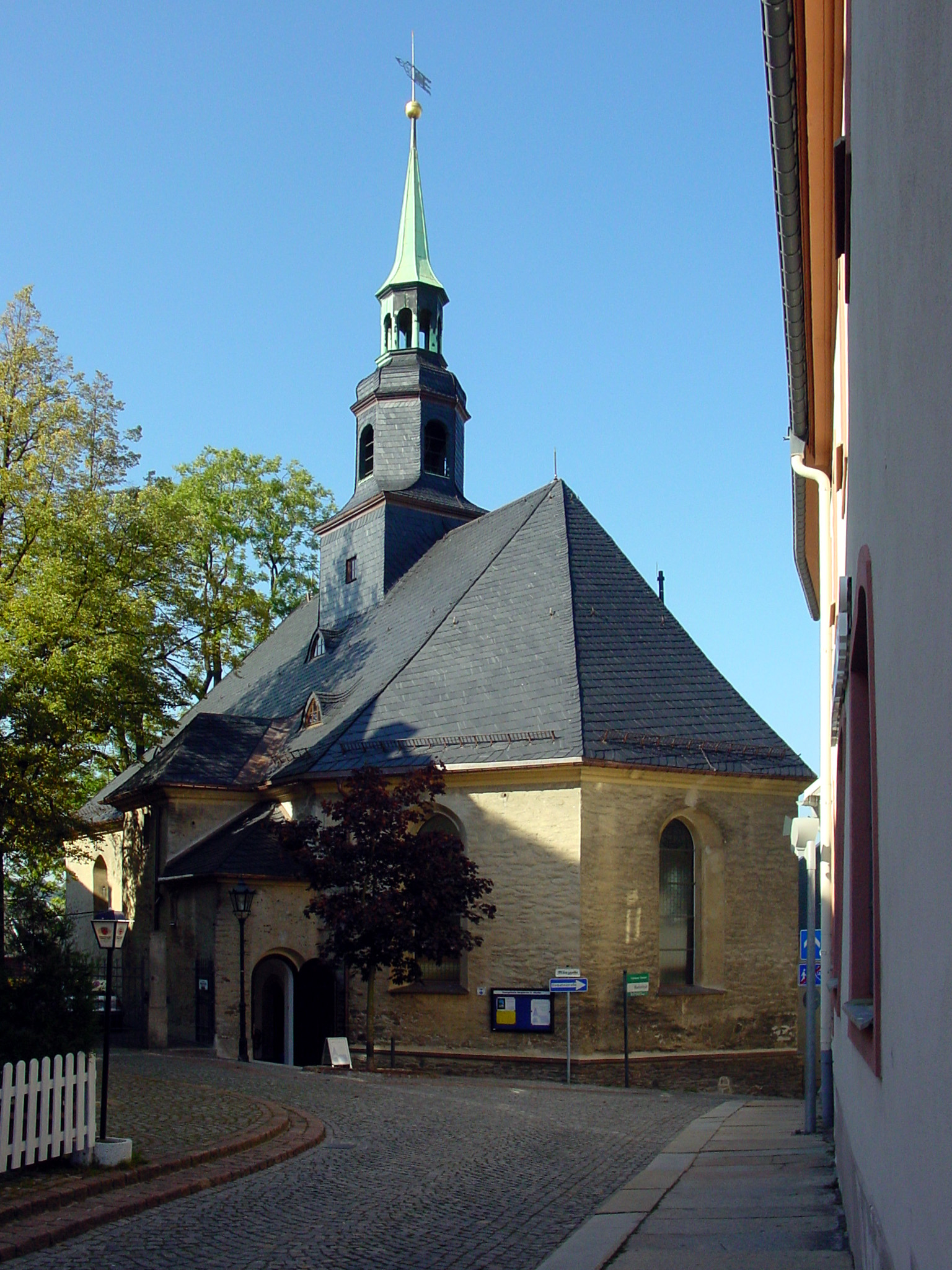
St. Mary's Church

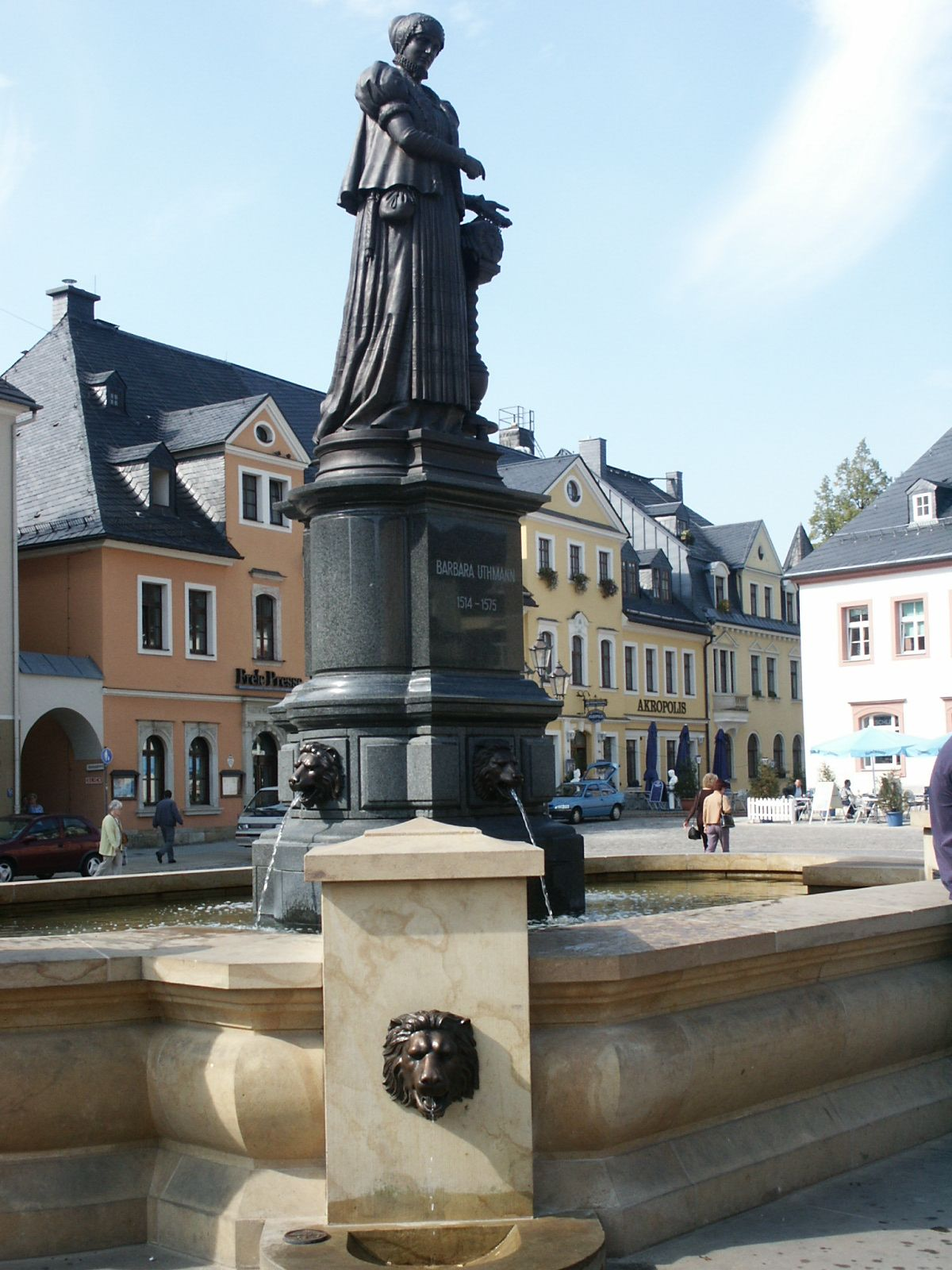
Uthmann Monument

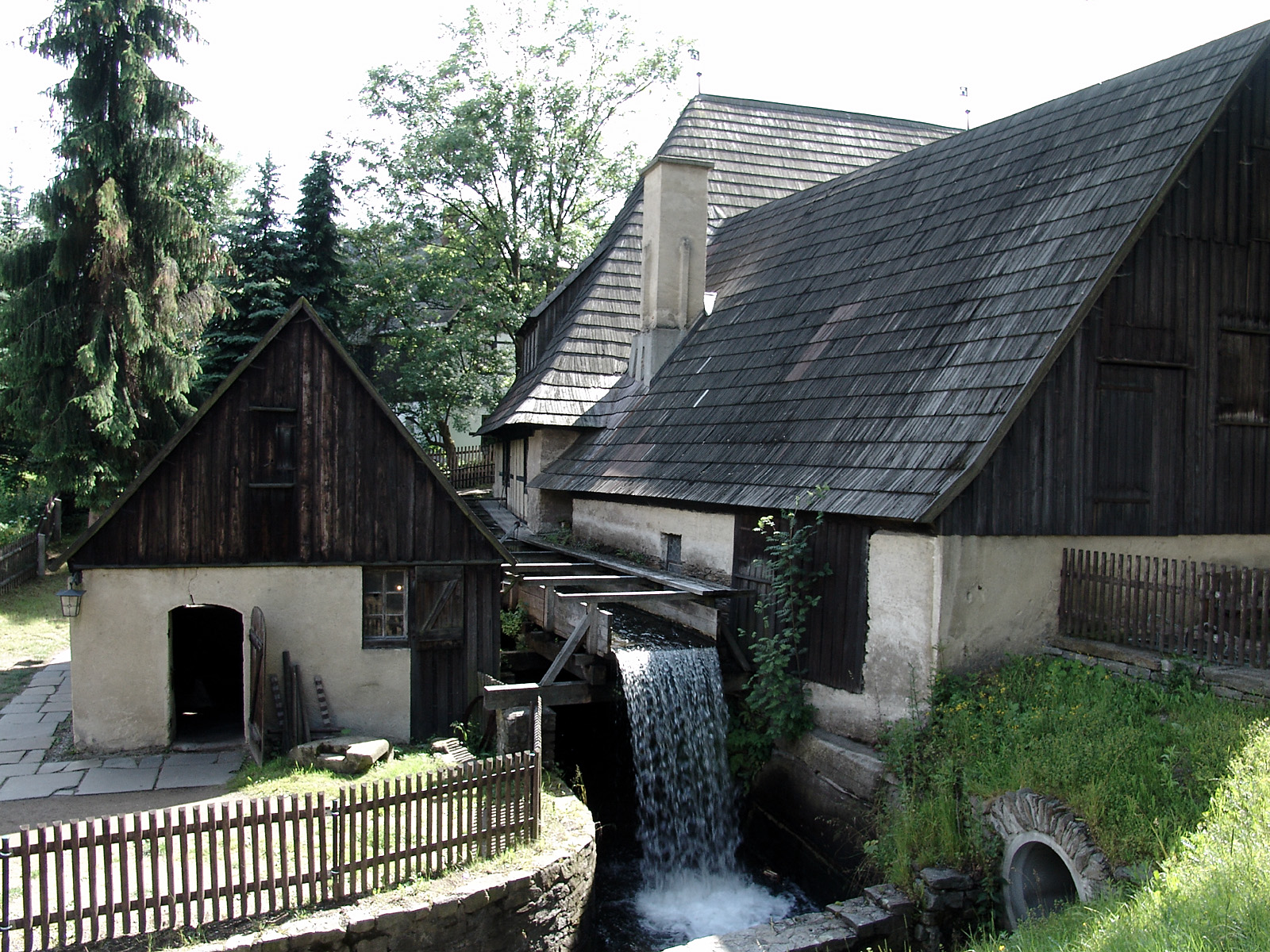
Frohnauer Hammer

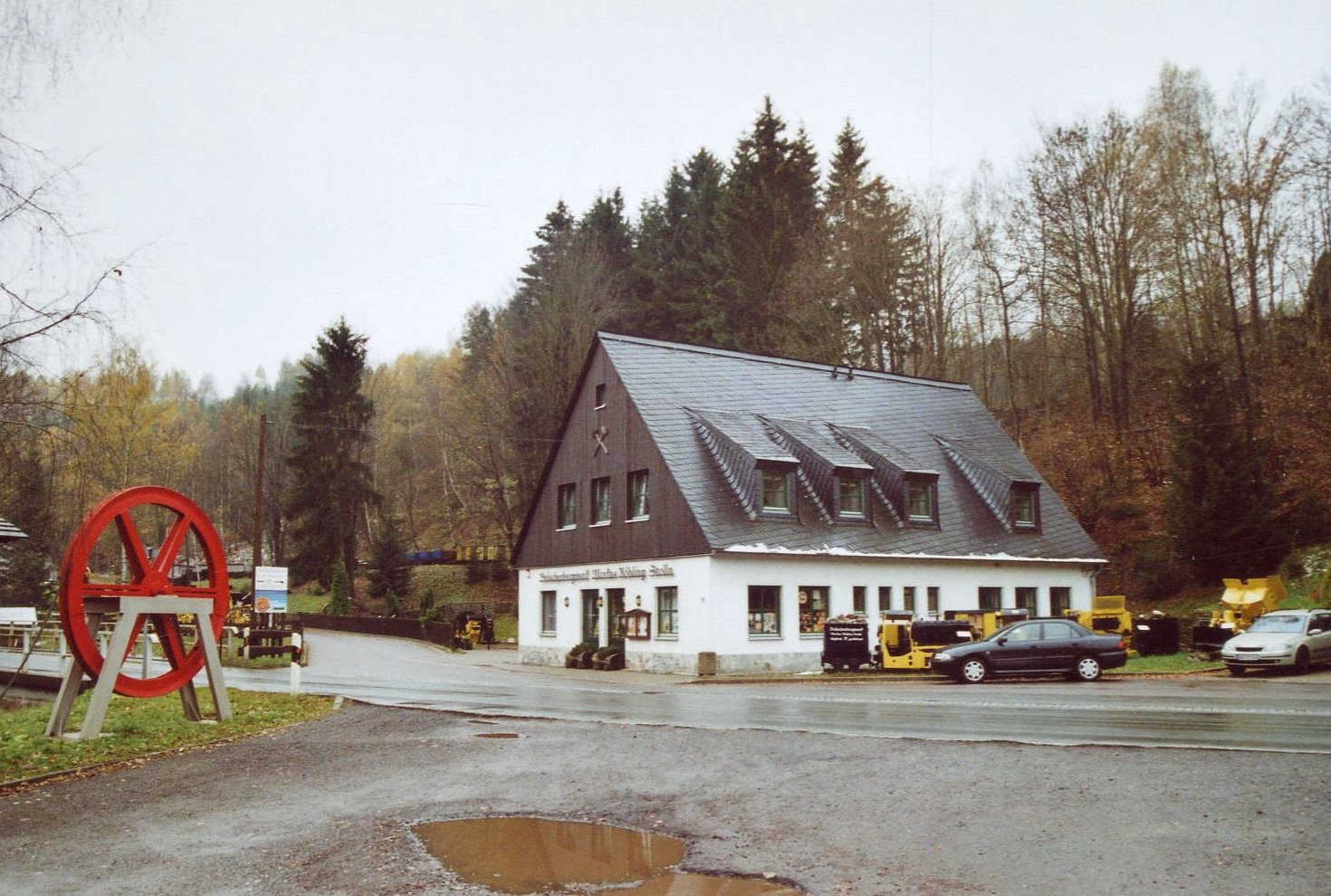
Markus Röhling Stolln

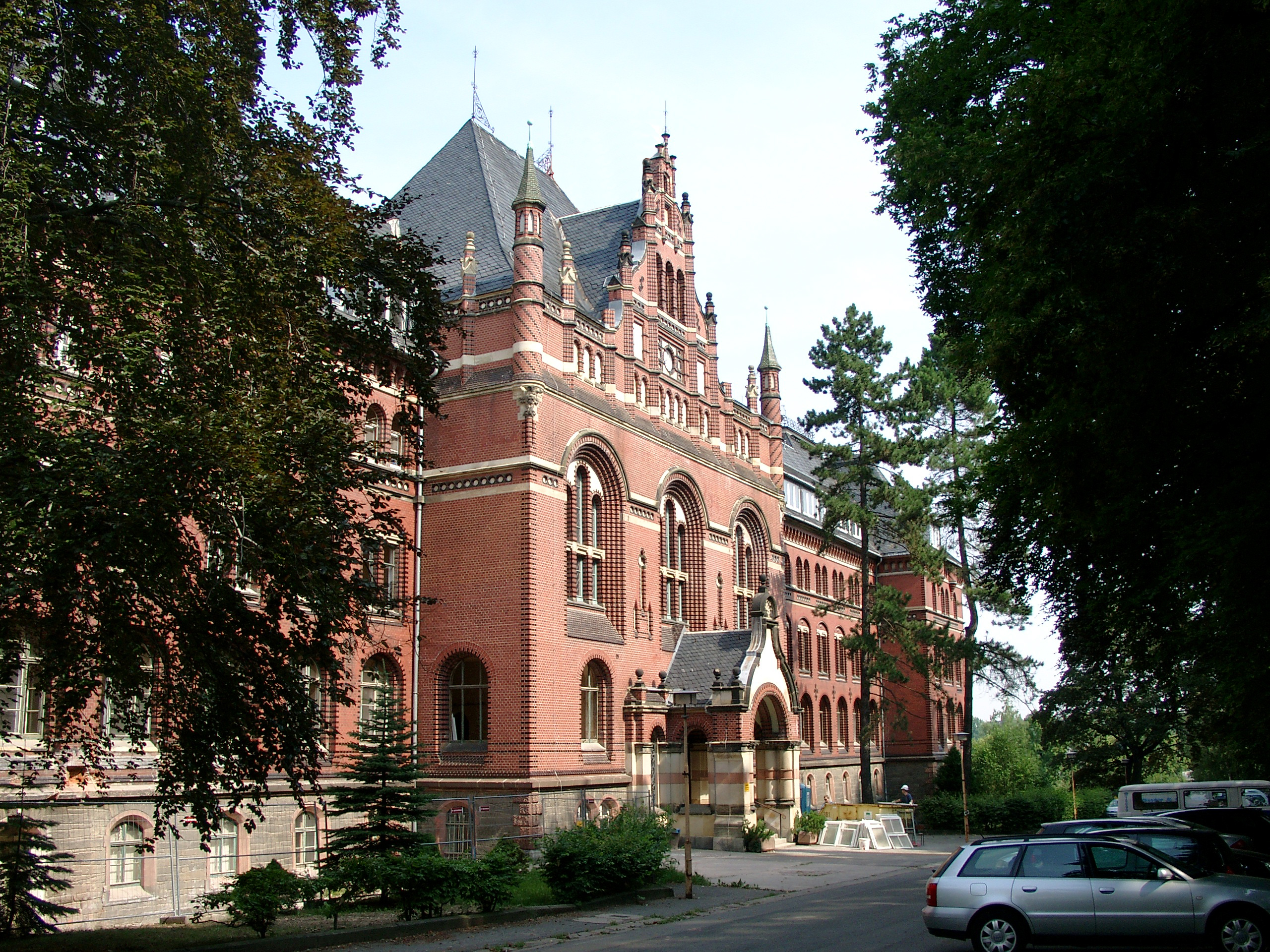
School building

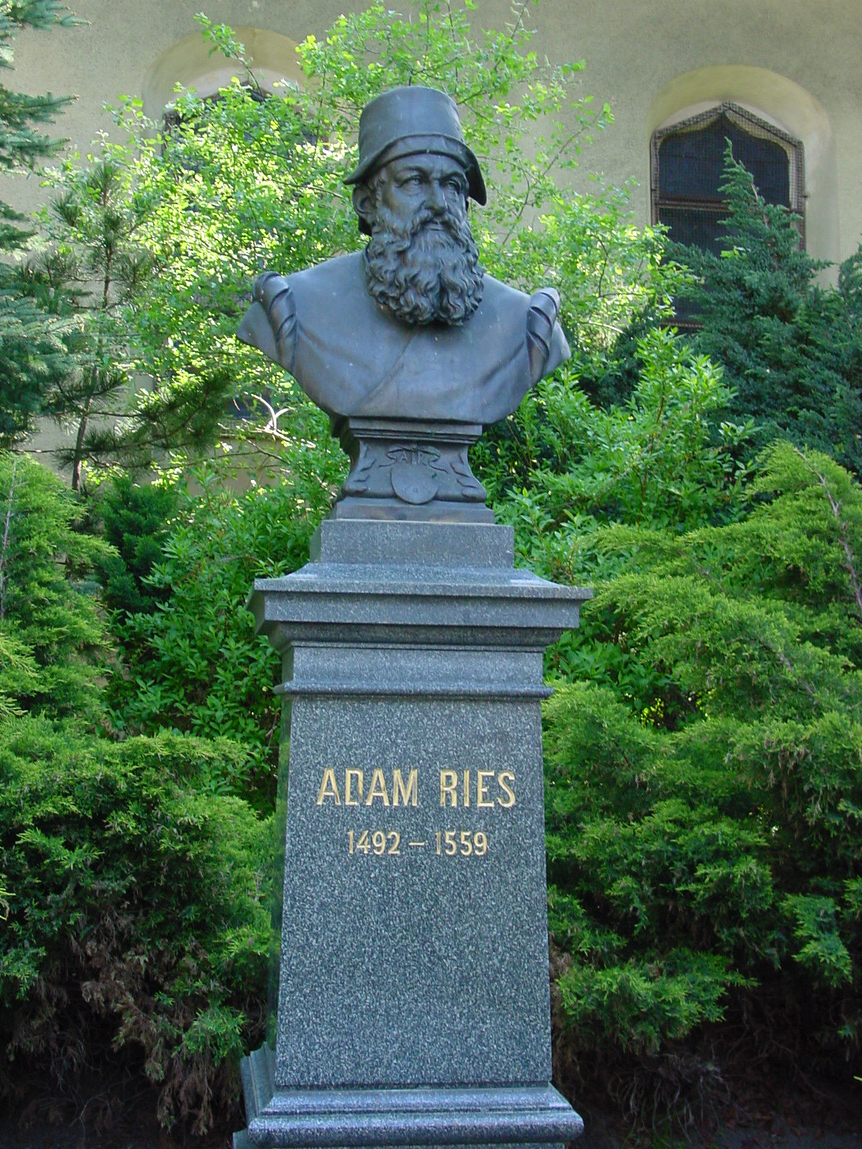
Adam Ries Monument

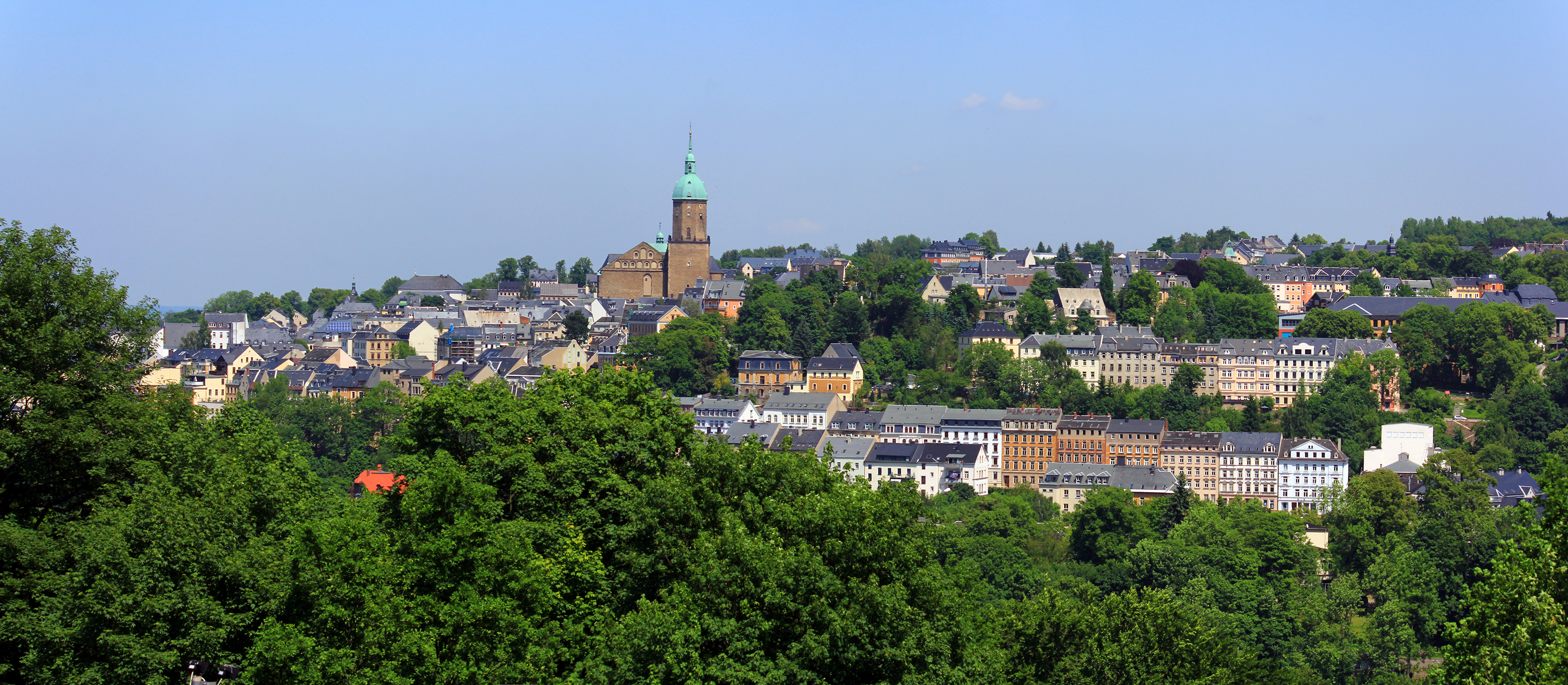
Panoramic view of the city silhouette

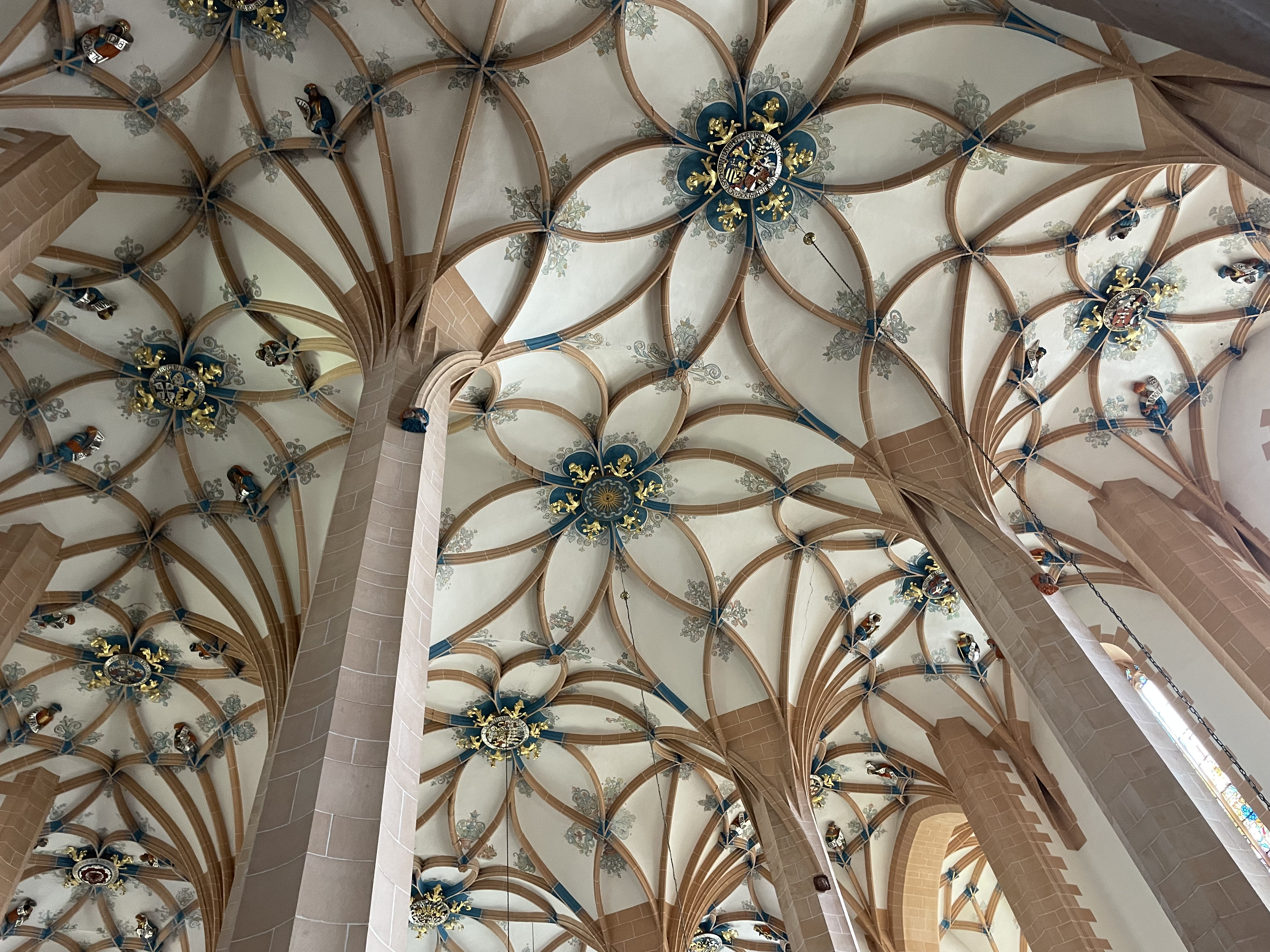
Annaberg-Buchholz church detail

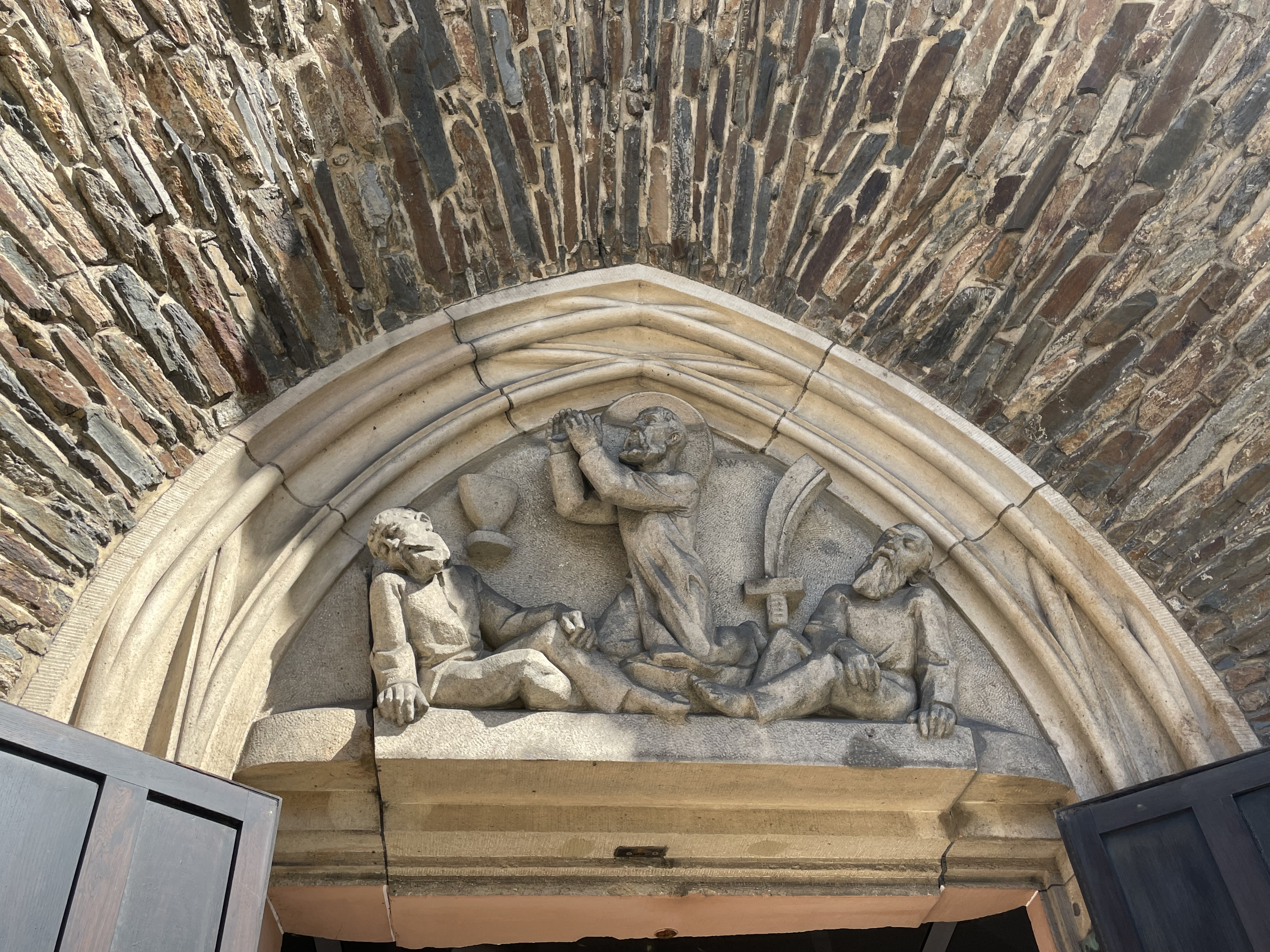
Annaberg-Buchholz church entrance

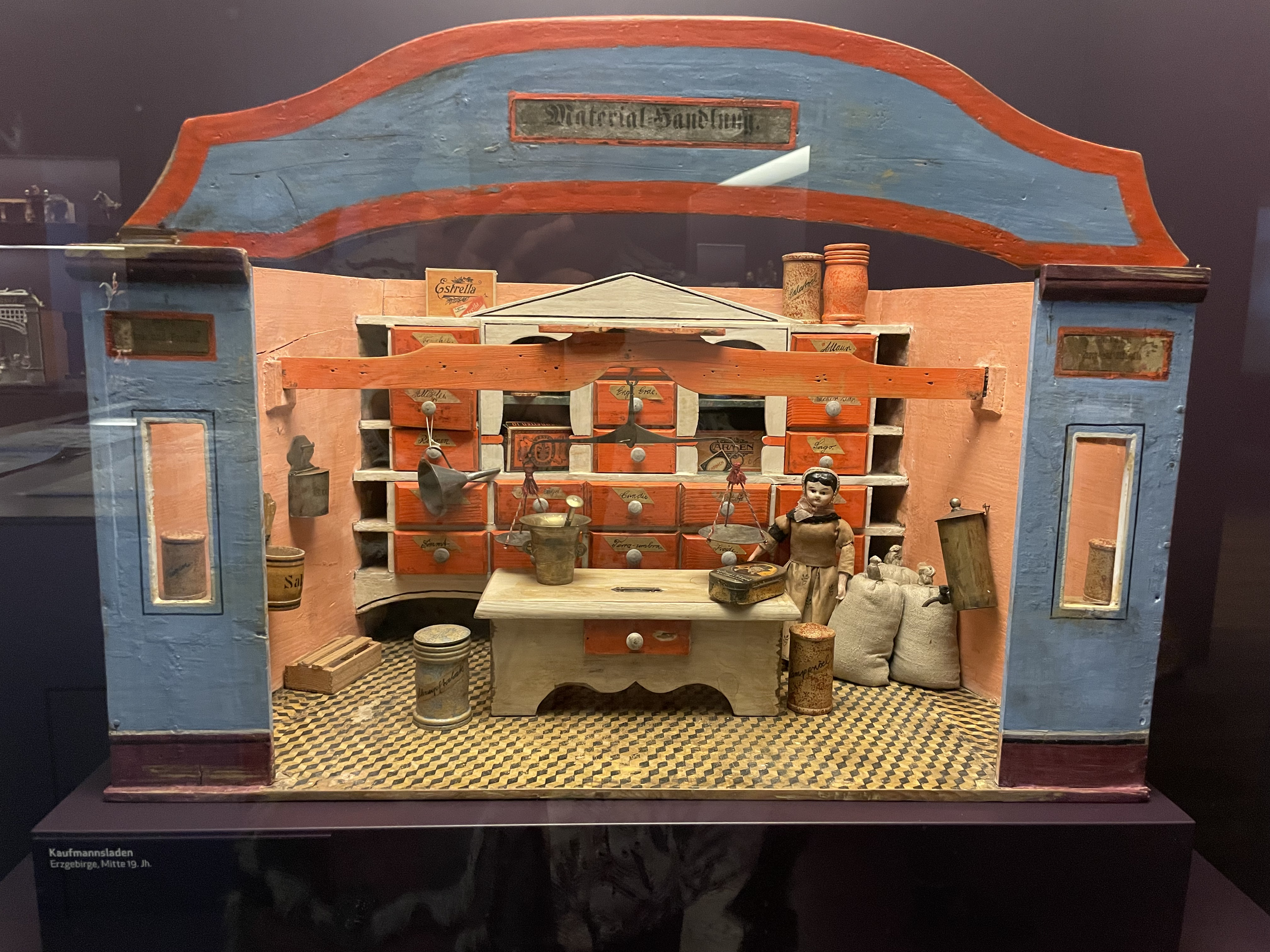
Annaberg-Buchholz toys museum item doll house

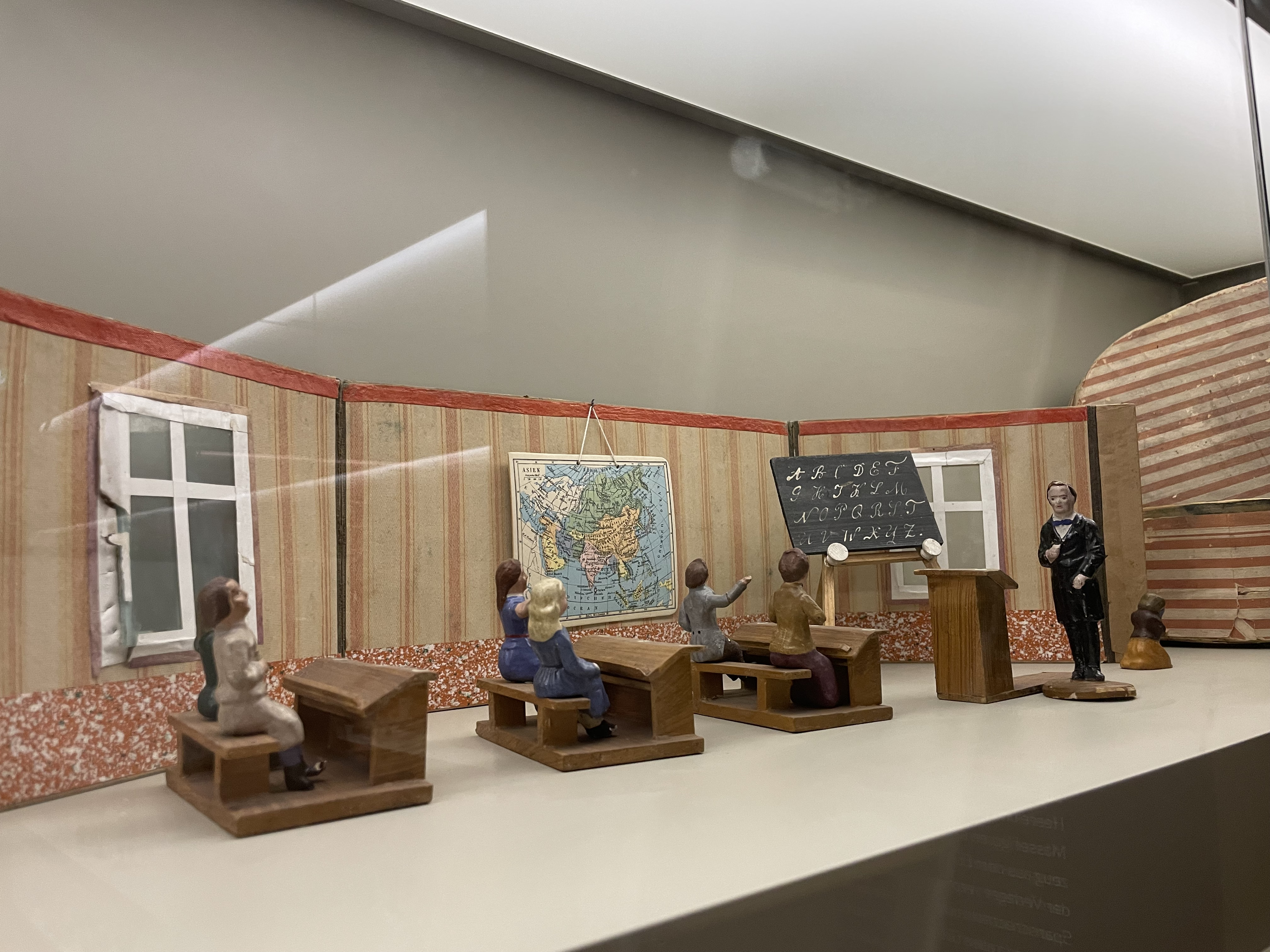
Annaberg-Buchholz toys museum item classroom

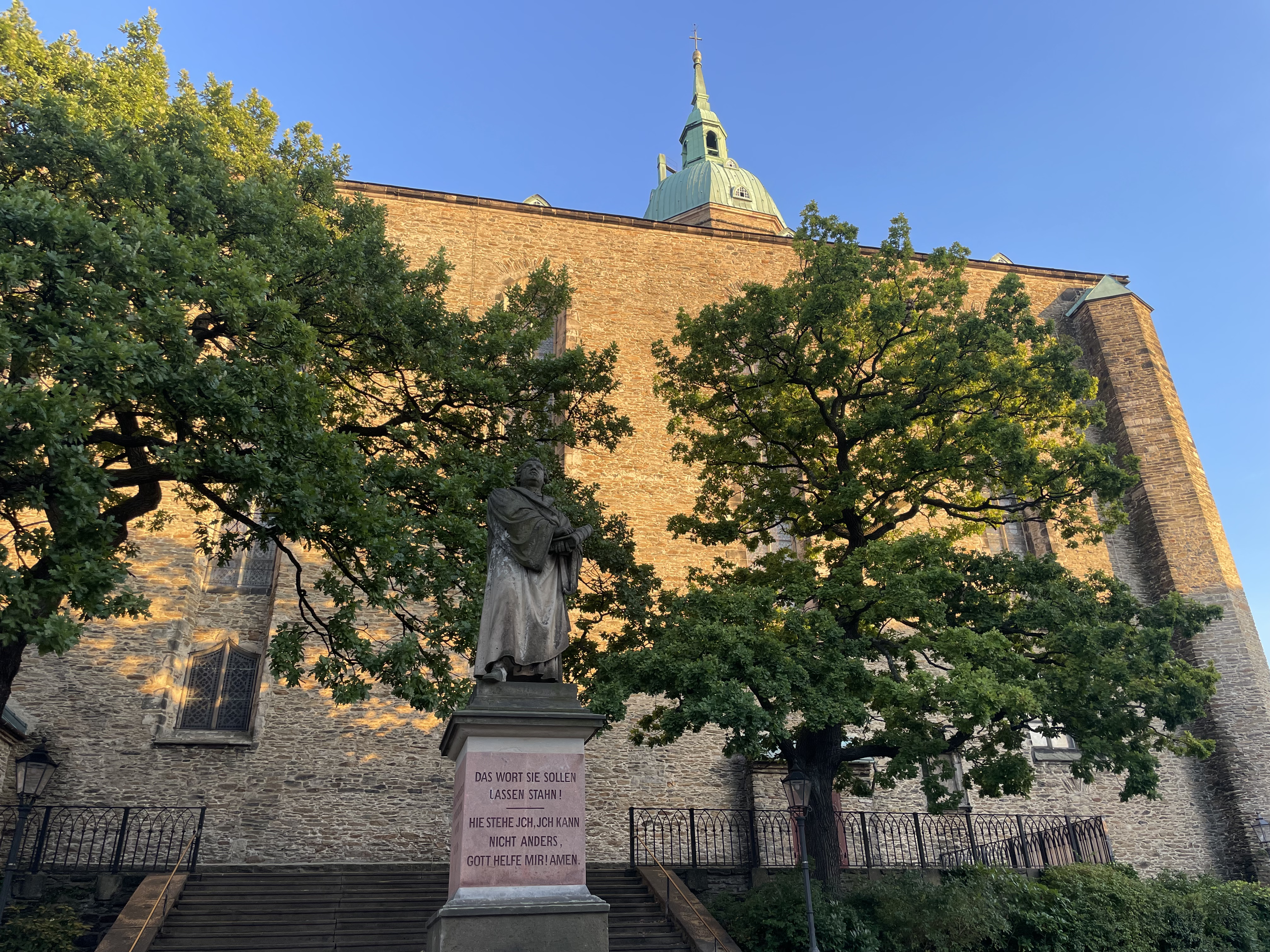
Annaberg-Buchholz monument and church

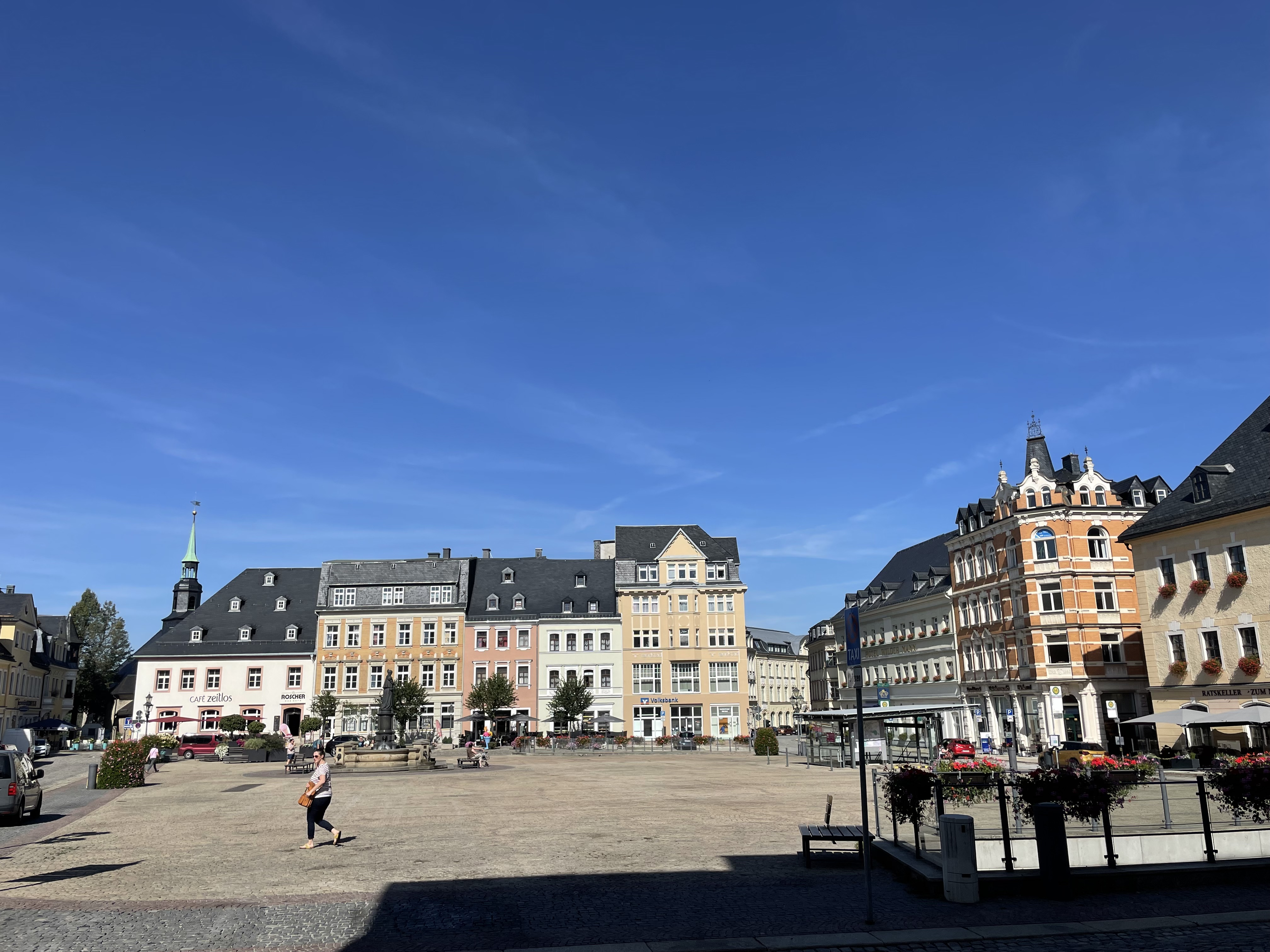
Annaberg-Buchholz main place

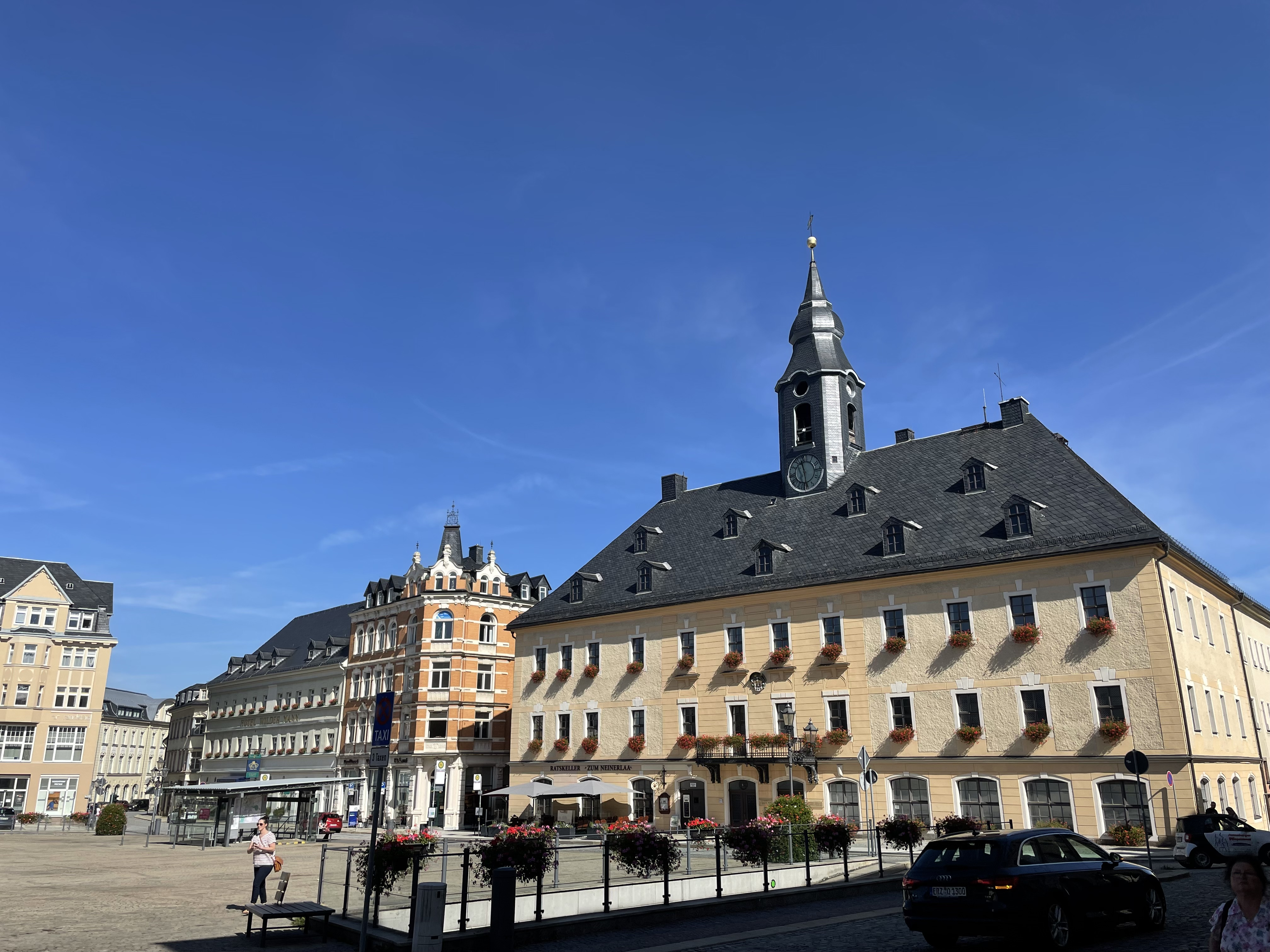
Annaberg-Buchholz main place - main house

== Sources ==
- Baynes, T. S., ed. (1878), "Annaberg" , Encyclopædia Britannica, vol. 2 (9th ed.), New York: Charles Scribner's Sons, p. 60
- Chisholm, Hugh, ed. (1911), "Annaberg" , Encyclopædia Britannica, vol. 2 (11th ed.), Cambridge University Press, p. 59
- Chisholm, Hugh, ed. (1911), "Buchholz" , Encyclopædia Britannica, vol. 4 (11th ed.), Cambridge University Press, p. 724
