= 1994–1996 Saxony district reform =

Changes to administrative divisions in Germany

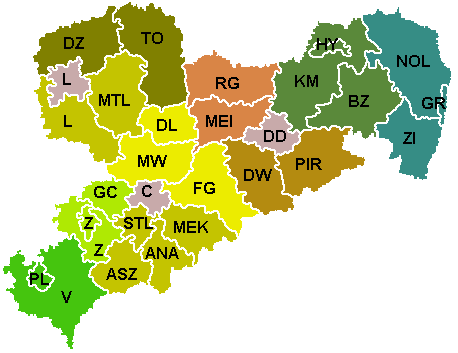
The districts created by the reform.

The 1994–1996 Saxony district reform was passed by the Landtag of Saxony on 24 June 1993. This resulted in the dissolution of the 48 districts and six independent cities established in Saxony in 1952, and the creation of 22 new districts and seven independent cities. This administrative structure remained in place until 1 August 2008, when the 2008 Saxony district reform came into force.

== Background ==
In April 1991, the state government decided to implement a district reform in Saxony. The target for the districts to be formed was a minimum population of 125,000.

The state government introduced an initial legislative proposal into the legislative process on June 29, 1992. This was preceded by hearings with the affected districts and associations. It envisaged the creation of six independent cities and 23 districts. During the legislative process, the districts' boundaries were changed several times. The final result deviated from the original draft in many cases.

Several districts subsequently filed lawsuits against the law with the Constitutional Court of Saxony. The lawsuits concerned the dissolution of the Dresden-Land district and the creation of the Meißen-Dresden and Saxon Switzerland districts; the dissolution of the Hoyerswerda and Kamenz districts and the creation of the independent city of Hoyerswerda and the West Lusatia district; the dissolution of the Plauen, Oelsnitz, Reichenbach, Auerbach, and Klingenthal districts and the creation of an Elstertal district and a Göltzschtal district; and the location of the district offices of the Leipziger Land district and the Lower Silesian Upper Lusatia district. The corresponding court rulings were handed down in June/July 1994. Because the court criticized deficiencies, in particular, in the consultation/participation of the plaintiff districts during the legislative process, the law was partially declared invalid. The state government was therefore forced to improve the district reform through three amending laws.

== Amending laws ==
- 1. District Reform Amendment Act of 6 September 1995 concerns the changes in the districts of Meißen-Radebeul and Westlausitz-Dresdner Land.
- 2. District Reform Amendment Act of 6 September 1995 concerns the formation of the Vogtland district
- 3. District Reform Amendment Act of 23 May 1996 concerns the district seat of the Lower Silesian Upper Lusatian district

== District structure ==
As a result of the district reform, the following districts were newly formed on 1 August 1994:

Name	Seat of the district office	Components	Legal successor of	Remarks
Annaberg	Annaberg-Buchholz	All municipalities of the former Annaberg; The municipalities of Ehrenfriedersdorf, Gelenau, Herold, Jahnsbach and Thum of the district of Zschopau	Annaberg	
Bautzen	Bautzen	all municipalities of the former Bautzen district; the municipalities of Bischofswerda, Burkau, Demitz-Thumitz, Frankenthal, Großdrebnitz, Großharthau, Neukirch/Lausitz, Rammenau, Ringenhain, Schmölln-Putzkau, Steinigtwolmsdorf and Weifa of the Landkreis Bischofswerda; the municipalities of Hermsdorf/Spree and Steinitz of the district of Hoyerswerda; the municipalities of Breitendorf, Cunewalde and Weigsdorf-Köblitz of the district of Löbau	Landkreis Bautzen; Landkreis Bischofswerda	Through the first amendment, parts of the Hoyerswerda district became part of the new Westlausitz-Dresdner Land district.
Chemnitzer Land	Glauchau	the municipalities of the Glauchau district with the exception of the municipalities of Dennheritz and Schlunzig; all municipalities of the Hohenstein-Ernstthal; the municipalities of Bräunsdorf, Chemnitz-Grüna, Kändler, Limbach-Oberfrohna, Mittelbach, Niederfrohna, Pleißa and Chemnitz-Röhrsdorf in the Chemnitz district	Chemnitz district; Glauchau district; Hohenstein-Ernstthal district	
Landkreis Delitzsch	Delitzsch	all municipalities of the former Delitzsch district; the municipalities of the district of Eilenburg with the exception of the municipalities of Audenhain, Mockrehna, Schöna, Strelln, Wildenhain and Wildschütz	Delitzsch district; Eilenburg district	
Elstertalkreis	Plauen	all municipalities in the district of Plauen; all municipalities in the district of Oelsnitz; the municipalities of Breitenfeld, Erlbach, Gunzen, Landwüst, Markneukirchen, Schilbach, Schöneck, Wernitzgrün and Wohlhausen in the district of Klingenthal	Plauen district; Oelsnitz district	Due to the Constitutional Court's ruling, the district was not formed. With the second amendment, the Vogtlandkreis district was formed on January 1, 1996, from the districts of Plauen, Oelsnitz, Klingenthal, Reichenbach, and Auerbach.
Landkreis Freiberg	Freiberg	all municipalities in the district of Brand-Erbisdorf; all municipalities in the district of Freiberg; the municipality of Euba in the district of Chemnitz; the municipalities in the district of Flöha with the exception of the municipalities of Altenhain, Borstendorf, Dittmannsdorf, Grünhainichen and Mühlbach; the municipalities of Neuhausen and Niedersaida in the district of Marienberg	District of Brand-Erbisdorf; District of Flöha; District of Freiberg	
Göltzschtalkreis	Auerbach/Vogtland	all municipalities of the former district of Auerbach; all municipalities of the former district of Reichenbach; the municipalities of Hammerbrücke, Klingenthal, Morgenröthe-Rautenkranz, Muldenberg, Tannenbergsthal and Zwota of the district of Klingenthal	Auerbach district; Klingenthal district; Reichenbach district	Due to the Constitutional Court's ruling, the district was not formed. With the second amendment, the Vogtlandkreis district was formed on January 1, 1996, from the districts of Plauen, Oelsnitz, Klingenthal, Reichenbach, and Auerbach.
Landkreis Leipziger Land	Borna	all municipalities of the former district of Leipzig; all municipalities of the district of Borna with the exception of the municipality of Steinbach; all municipalities of the district of Geithain with the exception of the municipalities of Ballendorf, Breitenborn, Buchheim, Bad Lausick, Ebersbach, Langenleuba-Oberhain and Niedersteinbach	Borna district; Geithain district; Leipzig district	
Landkreis Meißen-Dresden	Meißen	the municipalities of the Dresden district with the exception of the municipality of Schönfeld-Weißig; all municipalities of the Meißen district; the municipalities of Helbigsdorf and Wilsdruff of the Freital district (only until 1998)	Dresden district; Meißen district	Due to the Constitutional Court's ruling, the district could not be established until January 1, 1996. It did not include all of the municipalities of the former Dresden district and was renamed Meißen-Radebeul District. On January 1, 1997, it was renamed Meißen District .
Mittlerer Erzgebirgskreis	Marienberg	the municipalities of the district of Marienberg with the exception of the municipalities of Neuhausen and Niedersaida; the municipalities of the district of Zschopau with the exception of the municipalities of Ehrenfriedersdorf, Gelenau, Herold, Jahnsbach and Thum; the municipalities of Dittersdorf and Kleinolbersdorf-Altenhain in the district of Chemnitz; the municipalities of Borstendorf, Dittmannsdorf and Grünhainichen in the district of Flöha	Marienberg district; Zschopau district	
Mittweida district	Mittweida	all municipalities in the Hainichen district; all municipalities in the Rochlitz district with the exception of the Erlbach, Hausdorf and Lastau communities; the Auerswalde, Burgstädt, Claußnitz, Diethensdorf, Garnsdorf, Hartmannsdorf, Köthensdorf-Reitzenhain, Markersdorf bei Burgstädt, Mohsdorf, Mühlau, Niederlichtenau, Oberlichtenau, Taura bei Burgstädt and Wittgensdorf communities in the Chemnitz district; the Altenhain and Mühlbach communities in the Flöha district; the Breitenborn, Langenleuba-Oberhain and Niedersteinbach; communities in the Geithain district	Hainichen; district; Rochlitz district	
Muldental district	Grimma	all municipalities in the district of Grimma; all municipalities in the district of Wurzen; the municipalities of Ballendorf, Buchheim, Bad Lausick and Ebersbach in the district of Geithain; the municipalities of Erlbach, Hausdorf and Lastau in the district of Rochlitz; the municipality of Steinbach in the district of Borna.	Grimma district; Wurzen district	
Niederschlesischer Oberlausitzkreis	Görlitz from June 16, 1996: Niesky	all municipalities in the district of Görlitz with the exception of the municipalities of Altbernsdorf, Dittersbach, Kiesdorf, Leuba, Ostritz and Schönau-Berzdorf auf dem Eigen; all municipalities in the district of Niesky; all municipalities in the district of Weißwasser; the municipalities of Mönau and Uhyst in the district of Hoyerswerda (as of January 1, 1996); the municipality of Zoblitz in the district of Löbau (already as of January 1, 1994)	Görlitz district, Niesky district, Weißwasser district	The third amendment to the law designated Niesky as the district seat. The amendment came into effect on June 16, 1996.
Landkreis Riesa-Großenhain	Großenhain	all municipalities in the district of Großenhain; all municipalities in the district of Riesa	Riesa district, Großenhain district	
Sächsischer Oberlausitzkreis	Zittau	all municipalities of the Löbau district with the exception of the municipalities of Breitendorf, Cunewalde, Weigsdorf-Köblitz and Zoblitz; all municipalities of the Zittau district; the municipalities of Altbernsdorf, Dittersbach, Kiesdorf, Leuba, Ostritz and Schönau-Berzdorf on the Eigen of the Görlitz district	Löbau district, Zittau district	The district was renamed Löbau-Zittau district on January 1, 1995 .
Landkreis Sächsische Schweiz	Pirna	all municipalities of the Pirna district; all municipalities of the Sebnitz district (including the municipality of Lauterbach, which was incorporated into Stolpen from the Bischofswerda district on January 1, 1994)	Pirna district, Sebnitz district	Through the 1st Amendment Act, the district received the municipality of Schönfeld-Weißig from the district of Dresden.
Landkreis Stollberg	Stollberg/Erzgeb.	all municipalities of the former Stollberg district; the municipality of Zwönitz of the Aue district; the municipalities of Adorf/Erzgebirge, Burkhardtsdorf, Einsiedel, Kemtau, Klaffenbach, Neukirchen/Erzgebirge of the Chemnitz district	Stollberg district	
Landkreis Torgau-Oschatz	Torgau	all municipalities in the district of Torgau; all municipalities in the district of Oschatz; the municipalities of Audenhain, Mockrehna, Schöna, Strelln, Wildenhain and Wildschütz in the district of Eilenburg	Oschatz district, Torgau district	
Weißeritzkreis	Dippoldiswalde	all municipalities in the district of Dippoldiswalde; all municipalities in the district of Freital (initially excluding Helbigsdorf and Wilsdruff, which were added in 1998)	Dippoldiswalde district, Freital district	
Westerzgebirgskreis	Aue	all municipalities in the district of Aue except Zwönitz; all municipalities in the district of Schwarzenberg	Aue district, Schwarzenberg district	The name of the district was changed to Aue-Schwarzenberg district by a district council resolution on January 1, 1995 .
Westlausitzkreis	Kamenz	all municipalities in the district of Kamenz; all municipalities in the district of Hoyerswerda with the exception of the municipalities of Hermsdorf/Spree, Hoyerswerda (now independent city), Mönau, Steinitz and Uhyst; the municipalities of Bretnig-Hauswalde, Großröhrsdorf, Kleinröhrsdorf, Lichtenberg, Ohorn and Pulsnitz in the district of Bischofswerda.	Hoyerswerda district, Kamenz district	Due to the ruling of the Constitutional Court, the district could not be formed until January 1, 1996. It was initially named Westlausitz-Dresdner Land district, incorporating parts of the former Dresden district. On April 1, 1996, it was renamed Kamenz district
Landkreis Zwickauer Land	Werdau	all municipalities in the district of Werdau; all municipalities in the district of Zwickau; the municipalities of Dennheritz and Schlunzig in the district of Glauchau	Werdau district, Zwickau district	
