= Stollberg (district) =

Coordinates: 50°42′36″N 12°46′48″E

- District
- Coat of arms

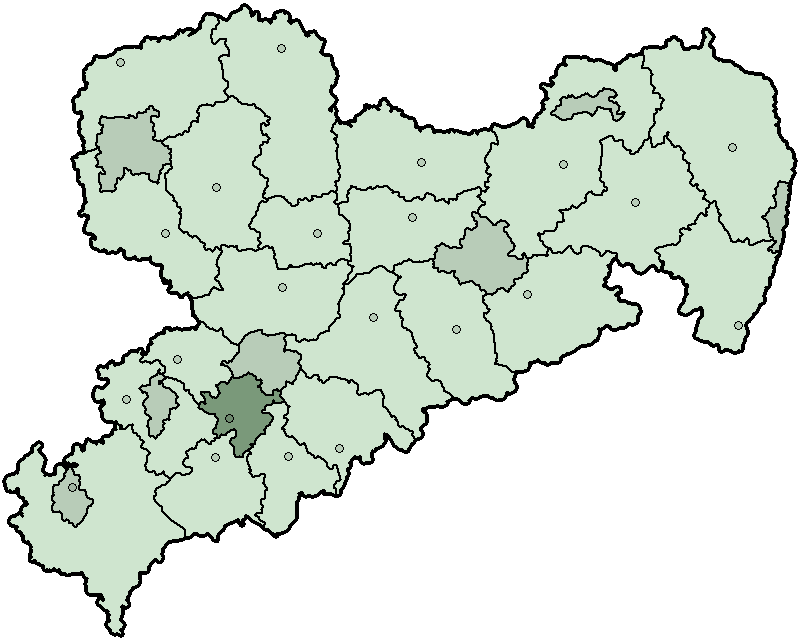
- Country: Germany
- State: Saxony
- Adm. region: Chemnitz
- Disbanded: 2008-08-01
- Capital: Stollberg

Area
  - Total: 266.49 km^{2} (102.89 sq mi)

Population (2001)
  - Total: 93,041
  - Density: 350/km^{2} (900/sq mi)
- Time zone: UTC+01:00 (CET)
  - Summer (DST): UTC+02:00 (CEST)
- Vehicle registration: STL
- Website: www.landkreis-stollberg.de

Stollberg is a former district in Saxony, Germany. It was bounded by (from the north and clockwise) the district-free city Chemnitz, and the districts Mittlerer Erzgebirgskreis, Annaberg, Aue-Schwarzenberg, Zwickauer Land and Chemnitzer Land.

== History ==
The district dates back to the Amtshauptmannschaft Stollberg, which was established in 1910. In 1939 it was renamed to Landkreis. In 1950 the district was dissolved and its municipalities were assigned to the neighboring districts Aue, Chemnitz and Zwickau. However two years later in another reform the district was recreated, only with a slightly different layout. In the communal reform of 1994 the district was enlarged by some municipalities from the district Chemnitz, and the city Zwönitz from the district Aue. On 1 August 2008 it was merged into the new district Erzgebirgskreis.

== Geography ==
The district was located on the northwestern slope of the Ore Mountains.

== Partnerships ==
Since 1990 the district had a partnership with the district Fürth in Bavaria.

== Coat of arms ==
The left half of the coat of arms show the symbol of the Counts of Schönberg - the county of Schönberg covered most of the area of the district. To the right is the imperial eagle symbolizing the Pleissnerland, an imperial estate. The colours of the right side are also identical with those of Meissen, as another part of the district historically belonged to the County of Meissen.

== Towns and municipalities ==
Cities
1. Lugau
2. Oelsnitz
3. Stollberg
4. Thalheim
5. Zwönitz
Municipalities
1. Auerbach
2. Burkhardtsdorf
3. Erlbach-Kirchberg
4. Gornsdorf
5. Hohndorf
6. Hormersdorf
7. Jahnsdorf
8. Neukirchen
9. Niederdorf
10. Niederwürschnitz
