= 2008 Saxony district reform =

Redistricting of Saxony, Germany

2008 Saxony district reform

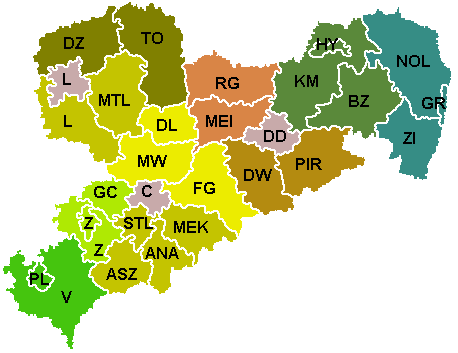
Saxony's districts before the district reform

Saxony's districts after the district reform

The 2008 Saxony district reform (also known as the 2008 administrative and functional reform or 2008 district reform) came into force on 1 August 2008 restructuring local government in the Free State of Saxony, Germany. The most important element of the reform was the further amalgamating, annexing, and merging of the districts created in the course of the 1994–1996 Saxony district reform, including the smaller independent cities. For a transitional period of five months, the formerly independent cities of Görlitz, Hoyerswerda, Zwickau and Plauen continued to perform district tasks, so that the district reform was practically only completed on 1 January 2009 when the new districts took over these tasks.

The reform was integrated into an administrative reform of the Saxon state authorities. On the basis of a proposal drawn up by a commission of experts, some of the state tasks were transferred to districts and municipalities.

A proposed abolition of the regional councils was not initially implemented, but the renaming to state directorates or directorate districts was within the framework of the Saxon Administrative Reorganization Act. On 1 March 2012, the three directorate districts were combined to form the Saxony State Directorate with locations in the cities of Chemnitz, Dresden and Leipzig.

== New districts ==
The 22 districts were reduced to ten and the seven independent cities to three. The “Saxon District Reorganization Act” was passed by the Landtag of Saxony on 22 and 23 January 2008.

The following new districts were formed:

=== Bautzen ===
The former district of Bautzen was enlarged to include the area of the district of Kamenz and the independent city of Hoyerswerda. The seat of the district administration is Bautzen.

The new district of Bautzen has an area of 2391 km^{2} and is thus the largest district in Saxony. Its population was 315,174 on 9 May 2011.

BZ was chosen as the vehicle registration number from the old district of Bautzen. The previous distinguishing symbols BIW, HY and KM can be used again as of 9 November 2012.

=== Erzgebirge ===
The Erzgebirgskreis includes the area of the former districts of Annaberg, Aue-Schwarzenberg, Stollberg and the Mittlerer Erzgebirgskreis. The seat of the district administration is Annaberg-Buchholz.

The new district has an area of 1828 km^{2}. Its population was 361,791 on 9 May 2011.

The new vehicle registration number is ERZ. The previous distinguishing symbols ANA, ASZ, AU, MAB, MEK, STL, SZB and ZP can be issued again as of 9 November 2012.

=== Görlitz ===
The district of Görlitz was formed from the areas of Löbau-Zittau, Niederschlesischer Oberlausitzkreis and the independent city of Görlitz. The seat of the district administration is Görlitz.

The new district has an area of 2106 km^{2}. Its population was 269,647 on 31 May 2011.

The vehicle registration number is GR. There are no differences in the allocation of number groups for the city and the municipalities in the rest of the Görlitz district. The previous distinguishing symbols LÖB, NOL, NY, WSW and ZI can be allocated again as of 9 November 2012.

=== Leipzig ===
The district of Leipzig includes the area of the former district of Leipziger Land and the Muldentalkreis. The district administration is located in Borna.

The new district has an area of 1,647 km^{2}. Its population was 262,214 on 9 May 2011.

The vehicle registration number is L and can be distinguished from the city of Leipzig by a different allocation group. The previous distinguishing symbols BNA, GHA, GRM, MTL and WUR can be assigned again as of 9 November 2012.

=== Meissen ===
The former district of Bautzen was enlarged to include the area of the former district of Riesa-Großenhain. The district administration is based in Meissen. Both districts merged their savings banks on 1 January 2007.

The new district of Meissen has an area of 1452 km^{2}. Its population was 247,054 on 9 May 2011.

MEI was chosen as the vehicle registration number for the old district of Meißen. The previous distinguishing symbols GRH, RG and RIE can be used again as of 9 November 2012.

=== Mittelsachsen ===
The district of Mittelsachsen covers the area of the former districts of Döbeln, Freiberg and Mittweida. The district administration is located in Freiberg. A special feature is the fact that the district of Döbeln belonged to the Leipzig administrative district, but the new district belongs entirely to the Chemnitz administrative district. This change is the only one of its kind in this district reform.

The new district has an area of 2112 km^{2}. Its population was 322,078 on 9 May 2011.

The old Freiberg district's license plate FG will be retained. The district council decided this on 20 October 2008. On 7 June 2009, a referendum on the license plate was held in conjunction with the European elections. The vote was about whether the current FG should be replaced by MSN. The citizens voted against this request with a narrow majority of 52.67% and thus in favor of retaining the license plate FG. The previous distinguishing signs BED, DL, FLÖ, HC, MW and RL can be issued again as of 9 November 2012.

=== Nordsachsen ===
The new district of Nordsachsen includes the area of the former districts of Delitzsch und Torgau-Oschatz. The district administration is located in the town of Torgau.

The new district has an area of 2020 km^{2}. Its population was 201,165 on 9 May 2011. It is the least populous of the Saxon districts.

TDO (for Torgau, Delitzsch and Oschatz) was chosen as the new vehicle registration number. The previous distinguishing symbols DZ, EB, OZ, TG and TO can be used again from 9 November 2012.

=== Sächsische Schweiz-Osterzgebirge ===
The district of Sächsische Schweiz-Osterzgebirge includes the area of the districts of Sächsische Schweiz and Weißeritzkreis. The district administration is located in the town of Pirna.

The new district has an area of 1654 km^{2}. Its population was 246,818 on 9 May 2011.

The vehicle registration number is PIR. The previous distinguishing symbols DW, FTL and SEB can be used again from 12 November 2012.

=== Vogtlandkreis ===
The Vogtlandkreis district was enlarged to include the formerly independent city of Plauen. Plauen remains the seat of the district administration.

The new district has an area of 1,412 km^{2}. Its population was 240,052 on 9 May 2011.

The vehicle registration number is V. The previous distinguishing symbols AE, OVL, PL and RC can be used again as of 9 November 2012.

=== Zwickau ===
The new district of Zwickau includes the area of the former districts of Chemnitzer Land und Zwickauer Land as well as the formerly independent city of Zwickau. The seat of the district administration is in Zwickau.

The new district has an area of 949 km^{2} and is thus the smallest of all Saxon districts. Its population was 335,220 on 9 May 2011.

The vehicle registration number is Z. The previous distinguishing symbols GC, HOT and WDA can be used again as of 9 November 2012.

== Population and areas ==
| District | Population (31 December 2007) | Population (31 December 2021) | Area in km^{2} (31 December 2006) |
|---|---|---|---|
| Bautzen | 333,470 | 296,300 | 2390.62 |
| Erzgebirgskreis | 382,571 | 328,700 | 1828.35 |
| Görlitz | 288,735 | 248,300 | 2106.09 |
| Leipzig | 274,532 | 258,200 | 1646.76 |
| Meissen | 259,343 | 239,300 | 1452.37 |
| Mittelsachsen | 340.115 | 299,300 | 2111.49 |
| Nordsachsen | 214,184 | 197,500 | 2019,82 |
| Sächsische Schweiz-Osterzgebirge | 257,655 | 244,000 | 1653.60 |
| Vogtlandkreis | 253,672 | 221,400 | 1411.96 |
| Zwickau | 352,947 | 309,600 | 949.35 |

| District-free city | Population (31 December 2007) | Population (31 December 2021) | Area in km^{2} (31 December 2006) |
|---|---|---|---|
| Chemnitz | 244,951 | 243,100 | 220.86 |
| Dresden | 507,513 | 555,400 | 328.30 |
| Leipzig | 510,512 | 601,900 | 297.60 |

| State Directorate | Population (31 December 2007) | Population (31 December 2021) | Area in km^{2} (31 December 2006) |
|---|---|---|---|
| Chemnitz | 1,574,256 | 1,402,100 | 6522.01 |
| Dresden | 1,646,716 | 1,339,300 | 7930.98 |
| Leipzig | 999,228 | 1,057,700 | 3964.18 |

== Reactions to the state government’s plans ==
Most of the reactions of local authorities to the Interior Ministry's plans related to the choice of the new district seats or certain merger plans. In Zwickau and Plauen, the planned loss of district freedom led to a disagreement between the Interior Ministry and the mayors of the cities.

=== Hoyerswerda ===
In certain recent historical aspects relating to the history of Silesia, the merger with Bautzen was, in the opinion of some, rather disadvantageous; a merger of the former district of Hoyerswerda with the Niederschlesischer Oberlausitzkreis and Görlitz would have been more appropriate. The district name Lower Silesian Upper Lusatian district could have been retained and the construction of a new district office in Görlitz would have been unnecessary, as this could have continued in Niesky (the previous district seat). With the exception of the argument about the building, there was no argument that in any way justified the district seat being in Niesky rather than Görlitz. Others, however, preferred a merger with Bautzen, primarily because the transport links to Bautzen are much shorter than to Görlitz and even then there were far stronger commuter links with this city. Many historical reasons (from the time before the division of Upper Lusatia as a result of the Napoleonic Wars) also spoke in favour of Bautzen, e.g. B. that the Kamenz district is the main settlement area of the Sorbs and that Bautzen has in fact been the “capital” of the Sorbs since ancient times.

A further decline into insignificance and further economic decline are feared and predicted for the former independent city of Hoyerswerda. It was hoped that at least some offices of the Bautzen district would be brought to the city (which was successful) and that it would become the location for the rescue control center in Upper Lusatia. The newly formed district also had to cope with the city's high debts.

=== Plauen ===
Plauen did not want to lose its district independence and announced an alternative to merging with the Vogtland district. The plan was to keep the district independence but merge the offices with the Vogtland district (“Vogtland way”). The Saxon Ministry of the Interior rejected Plauen's request. The city of Zwickau has also expressed interest in this plan because it too fears receiving less financial support.

The city of Plauen then filed a lawsuit before the Saxon Constitutional Court and applied for an interim injunction against the district reform. On 22 April 2008, the court ruled that the application was manifestly unfounded. The city of Plauen was thus incorporated into the Vogtland district as planned on 1 August 2008. The district elections on 8 June 2008 were also held as planned.

=== Aue ===
At the end of January 2008, the town of Aue in the Aue-Schwarzenberg district had the legality of the 2008 administrative reform examined in an expedited procedure with the aim of moving the planned district seat to Aue rather than Annaberg-Buchholz. The Constitutional Court of the Free State of Saxony rejected the town of Aue's application for a municipal review of the law on 27 June 2008.

=== Landkreis Leipziger Land ===
The city of Borna only became the district capital of the Leipziger Land district in 1999.

The district reform of 1994 united the old districts of Borna, Geithain and Leipzig (collar district around Leipzig). At that time, the city of Leipzig became the district seat of the newly formed district of Leipziger Land. The seat of the district administration was therefore outside the district. The then districts of Borna and Geithain supported the merger with the district of Leipzig, which also made it clear that the district seat would go to Leipzig.

The district seat within the city of Leipzig was very controversial among the population, especially in the southern area of Leipzig.

The reform in 1999, which redrew the borders in the area surrounding the independent cities, meant that the northern part of the district, which comprised almost a third of the population, had to leave the district due to numerous villages being incorporated into the city of Leipzig and some municipalities being transferred to neighboring districts (including the reorganization of the cities of Schkeuditz and Taucha into the Delitzsch district and the municipality of Borsdorf into the Muldental district). This step was already demanded by many district administrators in the Leipzig area in 1994, but was met with resistance from the state government at the time.

In 1999, Borna was designated as the new district seat in the Leipziger Land district. The so-called "City-Environment Act" also stipulated that the city of Borna was obliged to build a district office. It was decided to extensively renovate a former barracks building for 16 million euros. The district office that was created in this way has been in use since 2003 and consists of six individual buildings.

The decision to appoint Borna and not Grimma as the district seat of the newly formed "Leipzig District" was very controversial. However, when the Saxon state parliament voted on the district reform on 23 January 2008, all amendments that would have made Grimma the new district seat of the Leipzig District were rejected. At the end of January 2008, both the Muldental District and its district seat Grimma filed a complaint with the Constitutional Court. The Constitutional Court of the Free State of Saxony rejected the city of Grimma's application for a municipal review of legal norms on 27 June 2008. The two medium-sized centers Borna and Grimma were considered to be of equal value. Ultimately, Borna's structural weakness, the expected better economic development due to the district seat and the greater importance of the existing links with the surrounding area of the city are said to have led to this selection.

The successful tourist and economic development of the Leipzig Neuseenland, a former mining landscape, is closely linked to the district seat in Borna.

=== Löbau-Zittau ===
In southern Upper Lusatia, the district reform was viewed with skepticism. Critics complained that it will lead to a division of Upper Lusatia, which would contradict the wishes of most citizens. In addition, a large Upper Lusatia district is the logical consequence of the dramatic population decline. It is also criticized that the unification of the Löbau-Zittau district, the Lower Silesian Upper Lusatia district and the previously independent city of Görlitz would create a structurally and financially weak district that would be permanently dependent on external aid. There are also conflicts over the integration of the Silesian heritage, which the Löbau-Zittau district does not share.

While the majority of citizens rejected the planned district reform in surveys and preferred a merger with Bautzen, politicians sent out contradictory signals. While some places in the north of the district spoke out in favour of a merger with Görlitz, places in the Oberland voted for Bautzen. The city of Zittau decided to reject the district reform, but the district administrator of the Löbau-Zittau district welcomed it.

=== Muldental ===
In the Muldentalkreis, the plans of the Ministry of the Interior were viewed with skepticism. The choice of Borna as the district seat was particularly criticized. After an objective discussion on this issue had been agreed with the Minister of the Interior, who again spoke out in favour of Borna, Matthias Berger, the mayor of Grimma, accused the Saxon Minister of the Interior of "undemocratic behaviour".

The head of the Saxon State Chancellery, Hermann Winkler, whose constituency is in Grimma, agreed to the Interior Ministry's draft, even though Borna was chosen as the new district town. Winkler then received calls for his resignation from many sides.

Since the city of Borna only became the district seat of the Leipziger Land district in 1999 (previously the city of Leipzig) and a territorial reform should last at least ten years according to the directive, the city of Borna would also have filed a lawsuit if it had lost its district seat.

Borna was chosen over Grimma as the future district seat, primarily because of the existing structural weakness in the southern Leipzig area due to the former brown coal opencast mines and because of the expected more favorable future economic development. However, this is very questionable from a technical point of view, as Borna has already shrunk increasingly over the past 15 years and therefore no economic improvement is to be expected. In addition, Borna is only the third largest city in the new district in terms of population (after Grimma and Markkleeberg). This is a result of the fact that Borna and Grimma have had to incorporate several towns in the past, which has increased the size of the towns. In addition, a former barracks site in Borna was extensively restored and converted into a district office for around 16 million euros. This is therefore cited as a further argument in favour of Borna as the future district seat. However, this is also questionable, as the Muldental district has also invested around 15 million euros in the renovation of its administrative buildings in the past.

The Muldental district commissioned a law firm to examine the constitutionality of the reform. The result was that the reform did not go far enough and violated the constitution of the Free State of Saxony.

The Muldental district's lawsuit was dismissed by the Saxon Constitutional Court on 25 September 2008.

=== Torgau-Oschatz ===
Although the Torgau-Oschatz district council voted unanimously against the merger with Delitzsch, both districts were merged. The opponents argued firstly that there are no common identities or relationships between the peripheral parts of the district (for example Schkeuditz and Oschatz). The planned structure is purely artificial. There were also fears in the Torgau-Oschatz district that the weak financial situation of the Delitzsch district would set the new district back as a whole and that it would essentially have to pay off its debts.

== Criticism ==
Ten years after the implementation of the district reform, the main criticism was that the hoped-for savings of 160 million euros per year did not materialize. Several cities have lost functions and thus importance. The former district administrators Petra Köpping and Gerhard Gey criticised the lack of proximity to citizens in the enlarged districts. A district administrator can hardly maintain all contacts at the municipal level.

== Literature ==
- Daniel Plogmann: Die Kreisgebietsreformen in den neuen Ländern – eine vergleichende Analyse. In: Zeitschrift für Landesverfassungsrecht und Landesverwaltungsrecht (ZLVR), 1/2016, S. 23–30.
