= Mittlerer Erzgebirgskreis =

- District
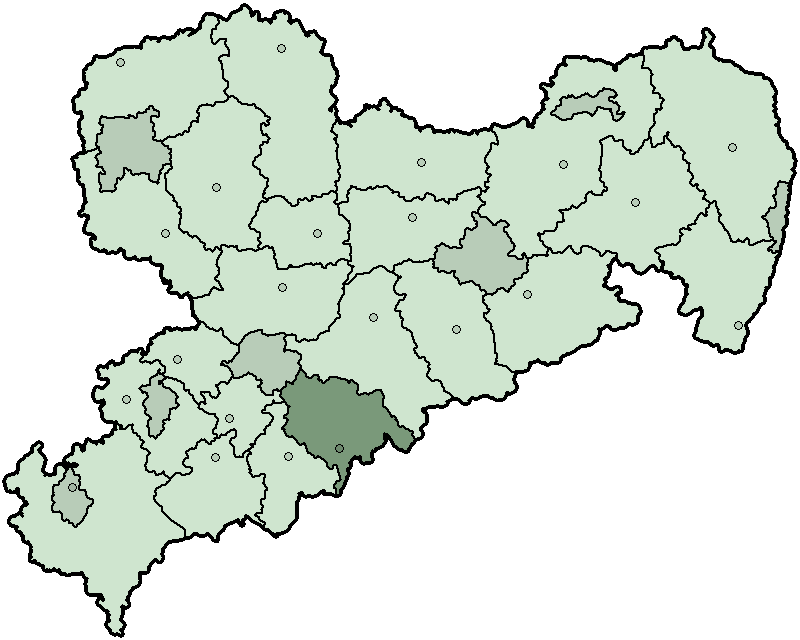
- Country: Germany
- State: Saxony
- Adm. region: Chemnitz
- Disbanded: 2008-08-01
- Capital: Marienberg

Area
  - Total: 595.36 km^{2} (229.87 sq mi)

Population (2001)
  - Total: 93,483
  - Density: 160/km^{2} (410/sq mi)
- Time zone: UTC+01:00 (CET)
  - Summer (DST): UTC+02:00 (CEST)
- Vehicle registration: MEK
- Website: www.erzgebirge-mek.de

The Mittlerer Erzgebirgskreis is a former district in Saxony, Germany. It was bounded by (from the west and clockwise) the districts of Annaberg, Stollberg, the district-free city Chemnitz, and the district Freiberg. To the south it borders the Czech Republic (the Karlovy Vary Region).

== History ==
The district was formed in 1994 by merging the two previous districts Marienberg and Zschopau. On 1 August 2008, it was merged into the new district Erzgebirgskreis.

== Geography ==
The district was located in the Ore Mountains. The highest elevation is the 891 m high Hirtstein, the lowest elevation with 305 m is located in Witzschdorf. 40% of the area is covered by forests.

== Coat of arms ==
The coat of arms shows three symbols of the typical industries of the district. To the left is a wheel, symbolizing the water mills which were abundant in the district, it also symbolizes the more modern industries. The tree to the left stands for the many forests and the timber industry, the hammers in the bottom are a mining symbol, as the district was a center of ore mining.

== Towns and municipalities ==
Towns
1. Lengefeld
2. Marienberg
3. Olbernhau
4. Wolkenstein
5. Zöblitz
6. Zschopau
Municipalities
1. Amtsberg
2. Börnichen
3. Borstendorf
4. Deutschneudorf
5. Drebach
6. Gornau
7. Großolbersdorf
8. Großrückerswalde

9. Grünhainichen
10. Heidersdorf
11. Pfaffroda
12. Pobershau
13. Pockau
14. Seiffen
15. Venusberg
16. Waldkirchen
