= Aue-Schwarzenberg =

Coordinates: 50°35′24″N 12°42′00″E

- District
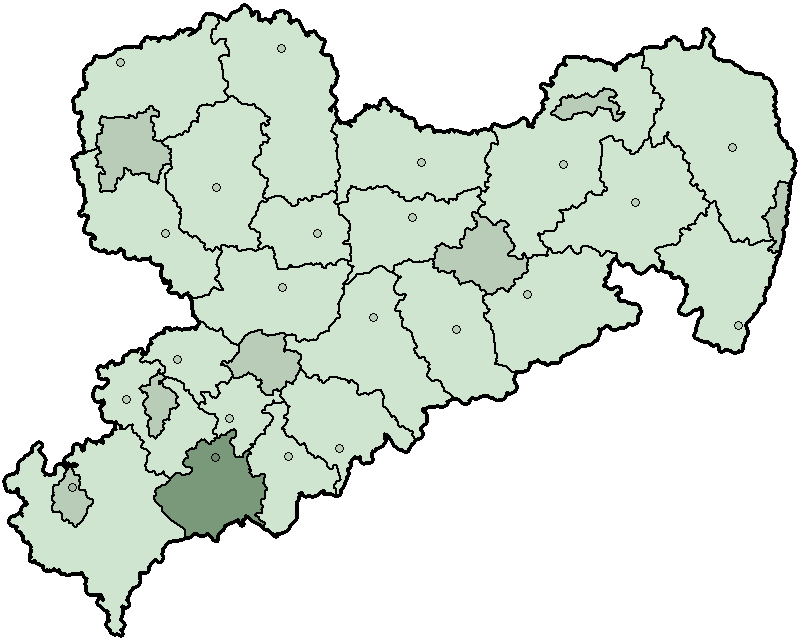
- Country: Germany
- State: Saxony
- Adm. region: Chemnitz
- Disbanded: 2008-08-01
- Capital: Aue

Area
  - Total: 528.25 km^{2} (203.96 sq mi)

Population (2001)
  - Total: 138,331
  - Density: 260/km^{2} (680/sq mi)
- Time zone: UTC+01:00 (CET)
  - Summer (DST): UTC+02:00 (CEST)
- Vehicle registration: ASZ
- Website: www.lra-asz.de

Aue-Schwarzenberg is a former district in Saxony, Germany. It was bounded by (from the south and clockwise) the Czech Republic and the districts of Vogtlandkreis, Zwickauer Land, Stollberg and Annaberg.

== History ==
The Ore Mountains were virtually unsettled in the early Middle Ages. There was an isolated monastery as early as the 12th century. Most of the towns in the mountains were founded in the 16th century, after the discovery of deposits of silver and tin. At this time the region was purchased by the aspiring state of Saxony (1533).

The districts of Aue and Schwarzenberg were established in 1873. In 1994 both districts were merged in order to form a new district, which was called Westerzgebirgskreis and was one year later renamed to the present name (Aue-Schwarzenberg). On 1 August 2008 it was merged into the new district Erzgebirgskreis.

== Geography ==
The district was located in the western part of the Ore Mountains. The crest of this mountain range forms the southern border of the district, which is also the German-Czech border. The highest peak in the district is the Auersberg (1019 m), second highest mountain of Saxony after the Fichtelberg.

The source of the Zwickauer Mulde is located in the district. From here it runs northwards to Zwickau.

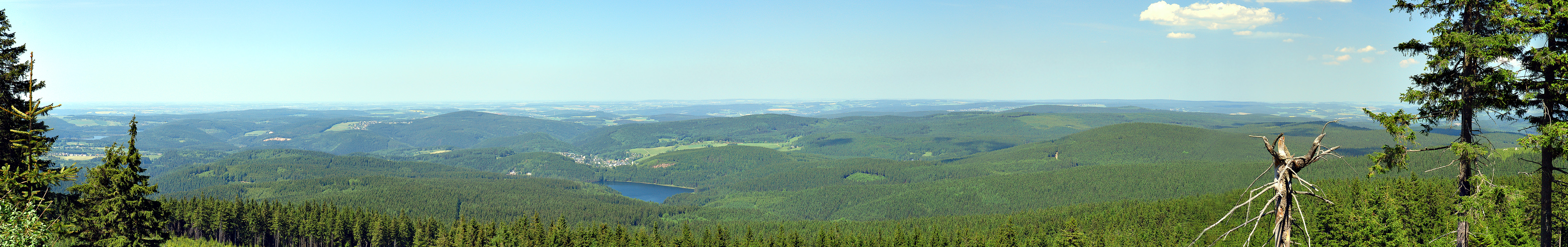
Panoramic view of Auersberg

== Coat of arms ==
The coat of arms displays:
- The clerical crook, which symbolises the monastery of Grünhain, which was by far the oldest settlement in this part of the Ore Mountains;
- The wolf's teeth, which were the arms of the county of Schwarzenberg;
- The black saltire on yellow ground. which was used by the county of Hartenstein, which possessed the northern parts of the district.

== Towns and municipalities ==
Towns
1. Aue
2. Eibenstock
3. Grünhain-Beierfeld
4. Johanngeorgenstadt
5. Lauter
6. Lößnitz
7. Schneeberg
8. Schwarzenberg
Municipalities
1. Bad Schlema
2. Bernsbach
3. Bockau
4. Breitenbrunn
5. Raschau-Markersbach

6. Schönheide
7. Sosa
8. Stützengrün
9. Zschorlau

== See also ==
- Free Republic of Schwarzenberg
