= Annaberg (district) =

Coordinates: 50°34′48″N 13°00′00″E

- District
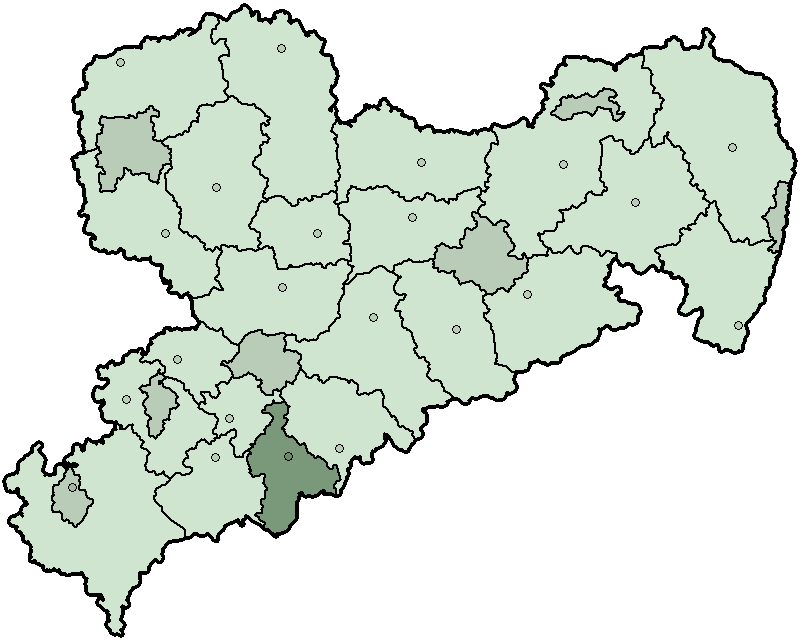
- Country: Germany
- State: Saxony
- Adm. region: Chemnitz
- Disbanded: 2008-08-01
- Capital: Annaberg-Buchholz

Area
  - Total: 438 km^{2} (169 sq mi)

Population (2001)
  - Total: 86,800
  - Density: 200/km^{2} (510/sq mi)
- Time zone: UTC+01:00 (CET)
  - Summer (DST): UTC+02:00 (CEST)
- Vehicle registration: ANA
- Website: www.erzgebirge-total.de/ana/

Annaberg is a former district in Saxony, Germany. It was bounded by (from the south and clockwise) the Czech Republic and the districts of Aue-Schwarzenberg, Stollberg and Mittlerer Erzgebirgskreis. Its colors are pink, green, and blue.

== History ==
In the Middle Ages the Ore Mountains were virtually unsettled and covered by dense forests. The towns of Annaberg and Buchholz (merged in 1945 to form Annaberg-Buchholz) were founded by the turn of the 16th century due to the discovery of silver and tin deposits. Now men from the Saxon lowlands moved into the mountains and founded many small towns and villages.

The district of Annaberg was established in 1874. By the late 19th century, mining, formerly of great importance, had been diverted to other localities, and the government department relating to it had moved to Marienberg in 1856. Annaberg, however, continued to be an important center for the manufacture of lace and fringes, which latter industry was introduced about 1590 by Protestant refugees from Spanish oppression in Flanders.

The district of Annaberg became a part of the new district Erzgebirgskreis on 1 August 2008. The district Erzgebirgskreisconsists of the former districts of Annaberg, Stollberg, Aue-Schwarzenberg and Mittlerer Erzgebirgskeis (Marienberg).

== Geography ==
The district was located in the western Ore Mountains on the Czech Republic–Germany border. It extended from the highest mountains on the border to more gentle hilly country in the north. The town of Oberwiesenthal is the highest located city of Germany. It is situated on the foot of the Fichtelberg, the second highest peak of the Ore Mountains at 1,214 metres (3,983 ft).

== Coat of arms ==
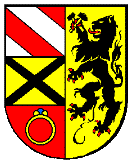
The coat of arms displays:
- Top left: the arms of the counts of Schönburg-Waldenburg
- Middle left: the arms of the counts of Werben
- Bottom left: the arms of the counts of Wolkenstein; this family as well as the two above-mentioned lines all had possessions in this part of the Ore Mountains during the late Middle Ages
- Right: the lion was the heraldic animal of the margravate of Meissen, the predecessor state of Saxony; in these arms the lion holds the mining tools in its fore-paw, symbolising the mining tradition of the Ore Mountains

== Towns and municipalities ==
Towns
1. Annaberg-Buchholz
2. Ehrenfriedersdorf
3. Elterlein
4. Geyer
5. Jöhstadt
6. Oberwiesenthal
7. Scheibenberg
8. Schlettau
9. Thum
Municipalities
1. Bärenstein
2. Crottendorf
3. Gelenau
4. Königswalde
5. Mildenau
6. Sehmatal
7. Tannenberg
8. Thermalbad Wiesenbad
