= Heinrich Moritz Chalybäus =

German philosopher (1796–1862)

Heinrich Moritz Chalybäus (German: [ˈhaɪnʁɪç ˈmoːʁɪts kalyˈbɛː.ʊs]; 3 July 1796, Pfaffroda – 22 September 1862, Dresden) was a German philosopher best known for his exegetical work on philosophy, such as his characterisation of Hegel's dialectic as a triad of "thesis–antithesis–synthesis."

== Biography ==
Chalybäus was born in Pfaffroda in Saxony. Chalybäus received his PhD from Leipzig University in 1820.

For some years, he taught at the knight academy in Dresden (Wackerbarth-Palais), and won a high reputation for his lectures on the history of philosophy in Germany. In 1839 he became professor at Kiel University, where, with the exception of one brief interval, when he was expelled with several colleagues because of his German sympathies, he remained until his death.

His first published work, Historische Entwicklung der spekulativen Philosophie von Kant bis Hegel (1837, 5th ed. 1860), which still ranks among the best expositions of modern German thought, has been twice translated into English, by Alfred Tulk (London, 1854), and by Alfred Edersheim (Edinburgh, 1854). His chief works are Entwurf eines Systems der Wissenschaftslehre (Kiel, 1846) and System der spekulativen Ethik (2 vols., 1850).

He opposed both the extreme realism of Herbart and what he regarded as the one-sided idealism of Hegel, and endeavoured to find a mean between them, to discover the ideal or formal principle which unfolds itself in the real or material world presented to it. His Wissenschaftslehre, accordingly, divides itself into:

1. Principlehre, or theory of the one principle;
2. Vermittelungslehre, or theory of the means by which this principle realizes itself; and
3. Teleologie.

The most noticeable point is the position assigned by Chalybäus to the world ether, which is defined as the infinite in time and space, and which, he thinks, must be posited as necessarily coexisting with the Infinite Spirit or God. The fundamental principle of the System der Ethik is carried out with great strength of thought, and with an unusually complete command of ethical material.

== Works ==
- Historical Development of Speculative Philosophy, from Kant to Hegel (1854), trans. by Alfred Edersheim – based on eighteen lectures delivered in 1835–36 in Dresden.
