= Free Republic of Schwarzenberg =

Areas in Saxony briefly unoccupied by the Allies in 1945

Free Republic of Schwarzenberg Freie Republik Schwarzenberg
- 1945
- Coat of arms of Schwarzenberg, showing Saint George

- Map of the localities in the Saxon part of the Ore Mountains reliably unoccupied from May 8, to June 24, 1945 Unoccupied locality Presumably unoccupied locality Occupied locality, for orientation
- Capital: Uncertain
- Historical era: World War II
  - German capitulation: May 8 1945
  - Soviet occupation: June 24
Preceded by	Succeeded by
Nazi Germany	Allied Occupation Zones in Germany; Soviet occupation zone

"Free Republic of Schwarzenberg" (German: Freie Republik Schwarzenberg) is a term applied to portions of western Saxony that were briefly not occupied by the Allies after the surrender of Nazi Germany on May 8, 1945. These districts of Saxony were thus self-governing for several weeks before occupation under the Soviet Union.

After the German surrender, the Saxony districts of Schwarzenberg, Stollberg, and Aue in the Ore Mountains were left unoccupied by Allies for unknown reasons. This led to anti-fascist groups forming local governments in those towns and villages, ending with the area's occupation by Soviet troops on June 24, 1945.

There has been speculation as to why neither American nor Soviet troops immediately occupied the area. One explanation is the Soviets and Americans agreed to stop on the banks of the Mulde river. Since there are several rivers with this name, and the Schwarzenberg area lies between them, there may have been some misunderstanding over the agreed boundaries. Another possible explanation is that the Allies simply overlooked the area until the lack of occupation was noticed.

== Government and organisation ==
The authority of the newly generated anti-fascist councils was still subject to democratic structures, though they were never intended to build a nation-state. The councils dealt with humanitarian issues since the unoccupied county of Schwarzenberg was not supported by any military force at the time. Issues the council dealt with included the maintenance of law and order, as well as dealing with scattered German soldiers fleeing west to avoid Soviet imprisonment.

After the Soviet occupation in June 1945, the councils were dismissed. However, their work was appreciated by the Soviets, and some councilmen kept their positions in similar Soviet-initiated councils for several years even after the German Democratic Republic was founded in 1949.

== Popular culture ==
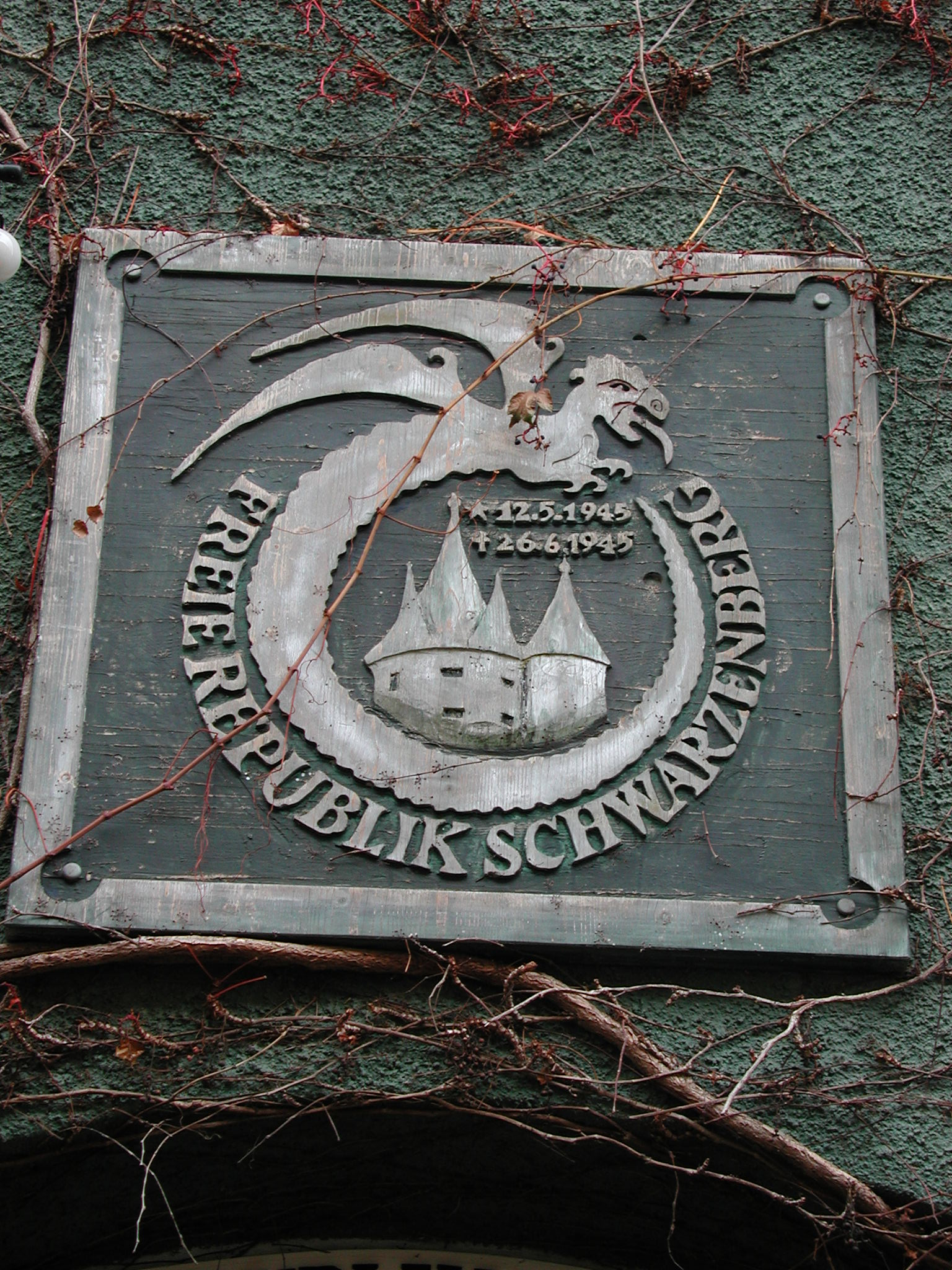
Memorial plaque to the "Free Republic of Schwarzenberg" on a house in the city center

The name "Free Republic of Schwarzenberg" is derived from the 1984 novel Schwarzenberg by Stefan Heym. As the novel is based on actual events, the name has become a convenient descriptor, although the book is primarily a work of fiction rather than a historical record.

The Haus Schwarzenberg structure in Berlin is named after the Free Republic of Schwarzenberg. The place contains street art, galleries, shops, and a center named after diarist and Holocaust victim Anne Frank.
