= Wildenstein (Verwaltungsverband) =

- Verwaltungsverband
- Location of Wildenstein within Erzgebirgskreis district
- Interactive map of Wildenstein
- Location within Germany Location within Saxony
- Coordinates: 50°46′N 13°09′E
- Country: Germany
- State: Saxony
- District: Erzgebirgskreis
- Seat: Grünhainichen
- Subdivisions: 2 municipalities

Area
  - Total: 44.17 km^{2} (17.05 sq mi)

Population (2025-12-31)
  - Total: 3,940
  - Density: 89.2/km^{2} (231/sq mi)
- Time zone: UTC+01:00 (CET)
  - Summer (DST): UTC+02:00 (CEST)
- Website: vv-wildenstein.com

Wildenstein is a Verwaltungsverband in the district Erzgebirgskreis in Saxony, Germany. The seat of the Verwaltungsverband is in Grünhainichen.

The Verwaltungsverband Wildenstein consists of the following municipalities:

1. Börnichen
2. Grünhainichen
