= Erlbach-Kirchberg =

- Ortsteil of Lugau
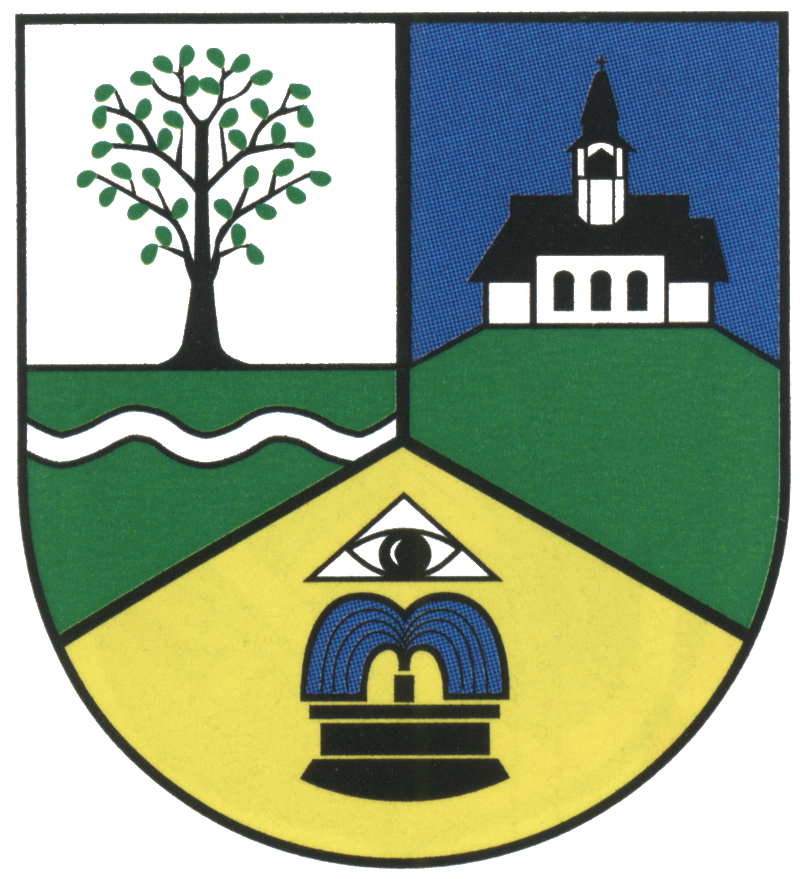
- Coat of arms
- Interactive map of Erlbach-Kirchberg
- Location within Germany Location within Saxony
- Coordinates: 50°46′N 12°46′E
- Country: Germany
- State: Saxony
- District: Erzgebirgskreis
- Town: Lugau

Area
  - Total: 15.88 km^{2} (6.13 sq mi)
- Elevation: 350 m (1,150 ft)

Population (2011-12-31)
  - Total: 1,673
  - Density: 105.4/km^{2} (272.9/sq mi)
- Time zone: UTC+01:00 (CET)
  - Summer (DST): UTC+02:00 (CEST)
- Postal codes: 09385
- Dialling codes: 037295
- Vehicle registration: ERZ

Erlbach-Kirchberg is a former municipality in the district Erzgebirgskreis, in Saxony, Germany. Since 1 January 2013, it is part of the town Lugau.

== History ==
Erlbach was established as a waldhufendorf settlement by Frankish farmers in the 12th century. The first documented mention of the place was in 1486.

== Monuments ==
A monument was erected in Erlbach graveyard in memorial of six unknown concentration camp prisoners who were murdered in the vicinity in March 1945 by SS soldiers on a death march from Auschwitz.

== Gallery ==
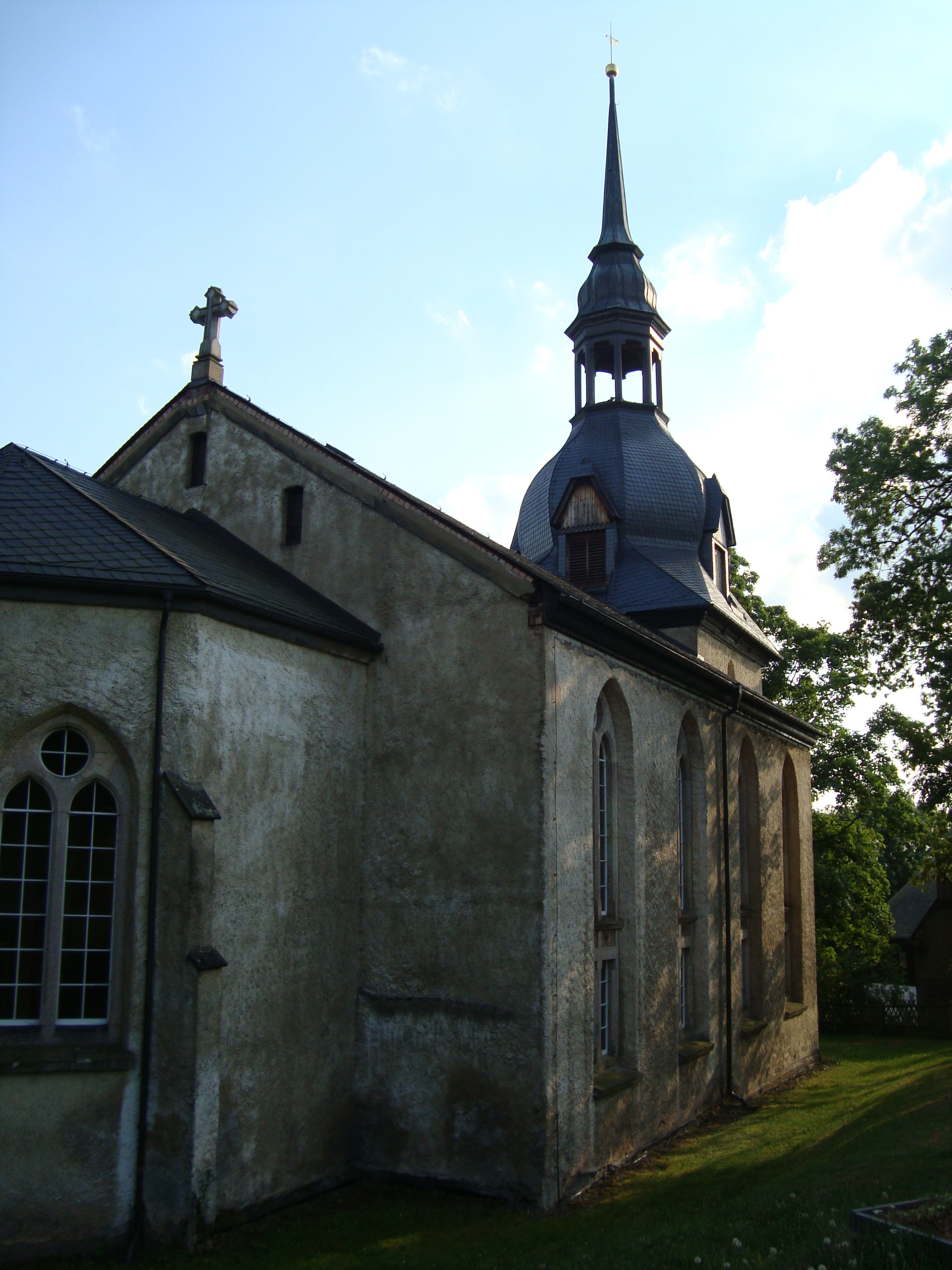
Erlbach church

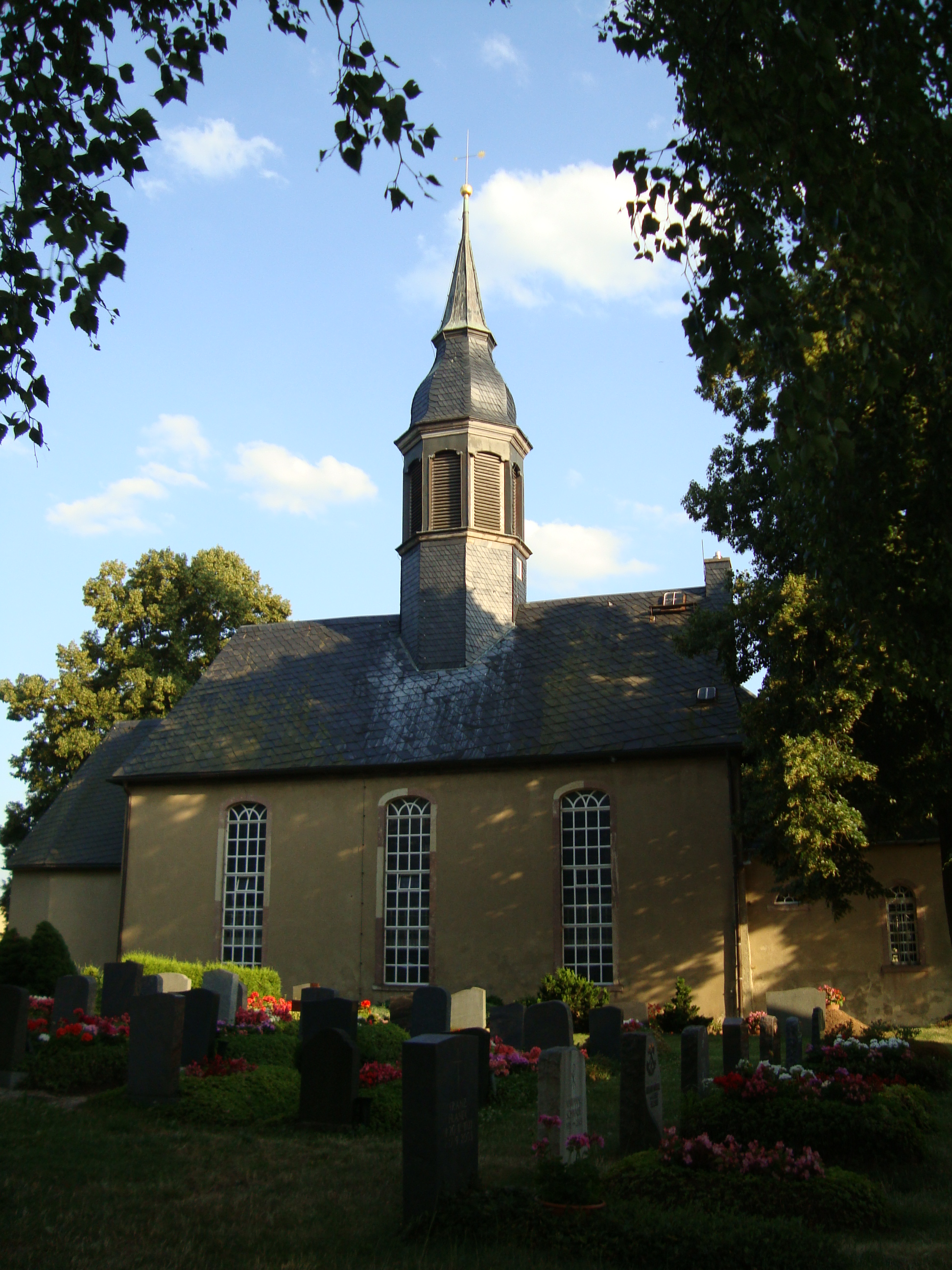
Kirchberg church
