= Borstendorf =

- Ortsteil of Grünhainichen
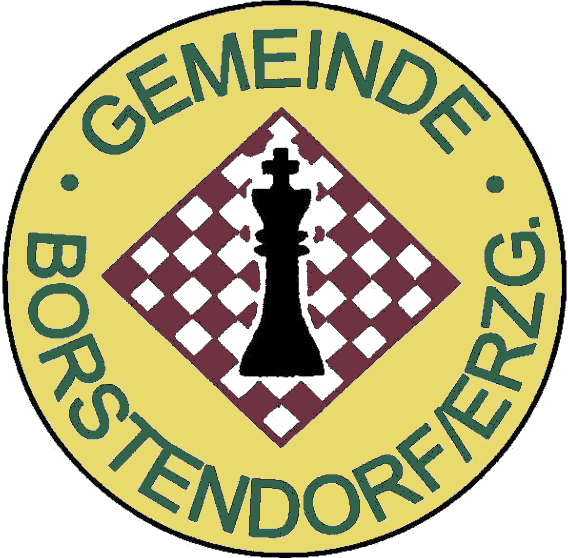
- Coat of arms
- Interactive map of Borstendorf
- Location within Germany Location within Saxony
- Coordinates: 50°46′20″N 13°10′41″E
- Country: Germany
- State: Saxony
- District: Erzgebirgskreis
- Municipality: Grünhainichen

Area
  - Total: 14.52 km^{2} (5.61 sq mi)
- Elevation: 454 m (1,490 ft)

Population (2013-12-31)
  - Total: 1,306
  - Density: 89.94/km^{2} (233.0/sq mi)
- Time zone: UTC+01:00 (CET)
  - Summer (DST): UTC+02:00 (CEST)
- Postal codes: 09579
- Dialling codes: 037294
- Vehicle registration: ERZ
- Website: www.borstendorf.de

Borstendorf is a village and a former municipality in the district Erzgebirgskreis, in Saxony, Germany. Since 1 January 2015 it is part of the municipality Grünhainichen.
