= Jahnsdorf =

- Municipality
- Coat of arms

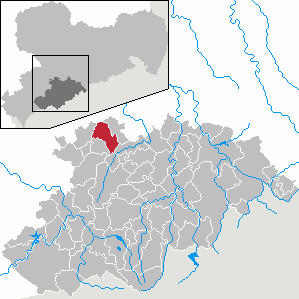
- Location of Jahnsdorf within Erzgebirgskreis district
- Interactive map of Jahnsdorf
- Location within Germany Location within Saxony
- Coordinates: 50°44′44″N 12°51′16″E
- Country: Germany
- State: Saxony
- District: Erzgebirgskreis
- Subdivisions: 4

Government
  - Mayor (2023–30): Albrecht Spindler

Area
  - Total: 26.10 km^{2} (10.08 sq mi)
- Elevation: 335 m (1,099 ft)

Population (2025-12-31)
  - Total: 5,208
  - Density: 199.5/km^{2} (516.8/sq mi)
- Time zone: UTC+01:00 (CET)
  - Summer (DST): UTC+02:00 (CEST)
- Postal codes: 09387
- Dialling codes: 03721 (Jahnsdorf); 0371 (Leukersdorf u. Seifersdorf); 037296 (Pfaffenhain)
- Vehicle registration: ERZ
- Website: www.jahnsdorf- erzgeb.de

Jahnsdorf is a municipality in the district Erzgebirgskreis, in Saxony, Germany.
