= Großolbersdorf =

- Municipality
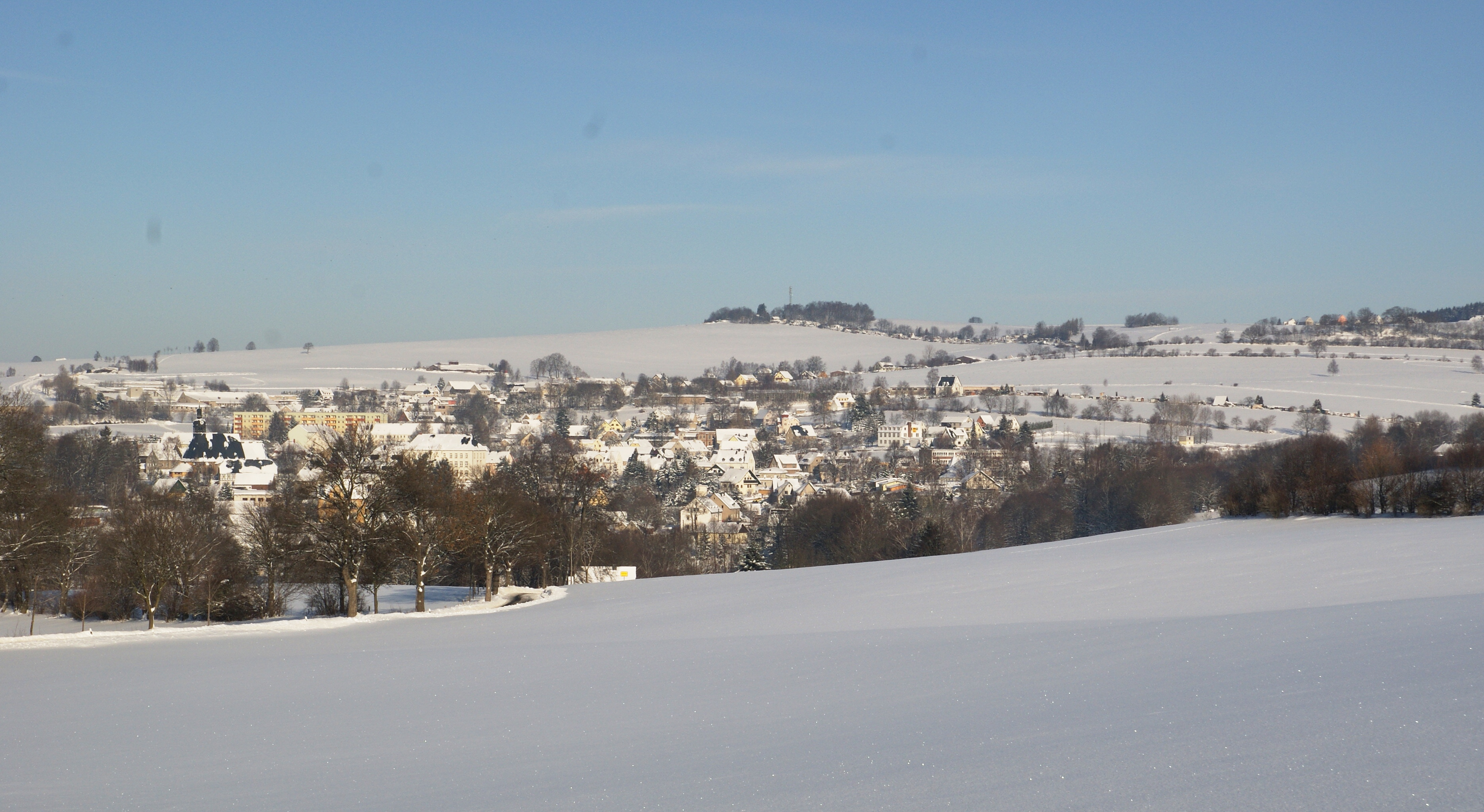
- Großolbersdorf in winter

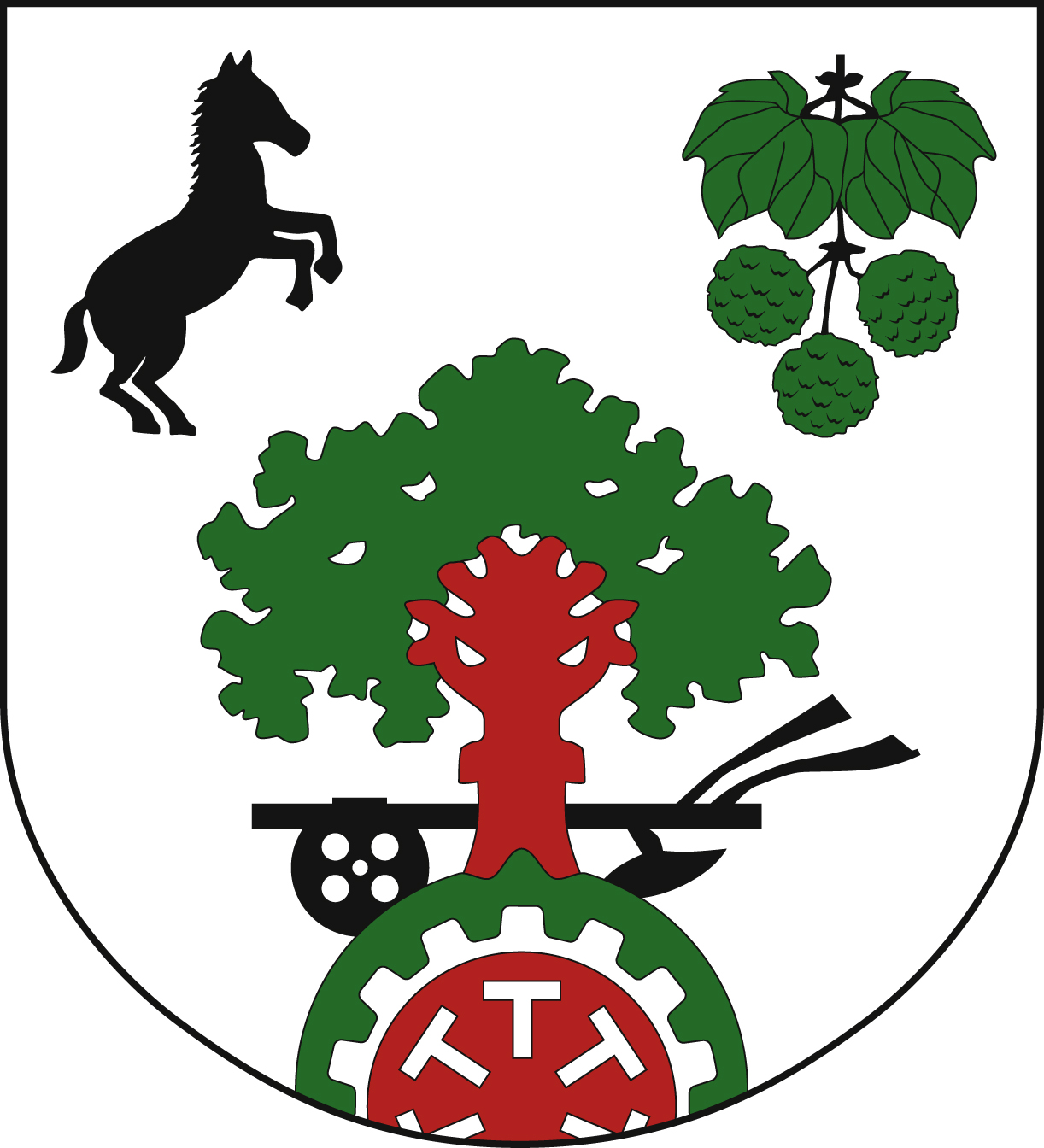
- Coat of arms

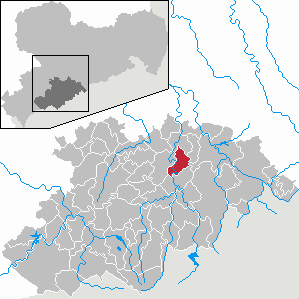
- Location of Großolbersdorf within Erzgebirgskreis district
- Interactive map of Großolbersdorf
- Location within Germany Location within Saxony
- Coordinates: 50°41′40″N 13°5′20″E
- Country: Germany
- State: Saxony
- District: Erzgebirgskreis
- Subdivisions: 3

Government
  - Mayor (2020–27): Uwe Günther

Area
  - Total: 22.61 km^{2} (8.73 sq mi)
- Elevation: 480 m (1,570 ft)

Population (2025-12-31)
  - Total: 2,707
  - Density: 119.7/km^{2} (310.1/sq mi)
- Time zone: UTC+01:00 (CET)
  - Summer (DST): UTC+02:00 (CEST)
- Postal codes: 09432 09434 09429
- Dialling codes: 037369 03725 im OT Hohndorf
- Vehicle registration: ERZ, ANA, ASZ, AU, MAB, MEK, STL, SZB, ZP
- Website: www.grossolbersdorf.de

Großolbersdorf is a municipality in the district Erzgebirgskreis in Saxony, Germany.
