= Börnichen =

- Municipality
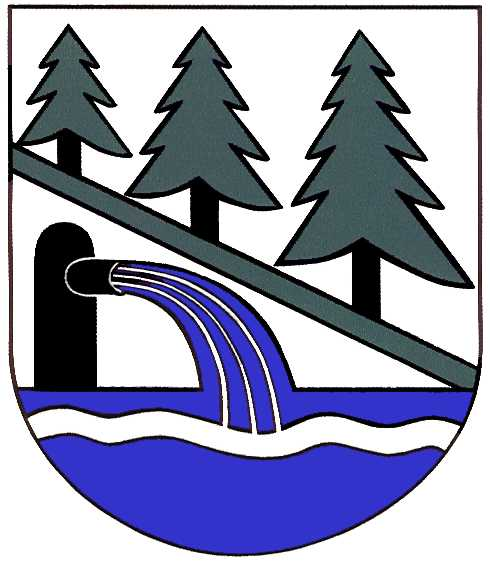
- Coat of arms

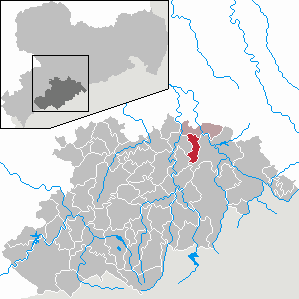
- Location of Börnichen within Erzgebirgskreis district
- Interactive map of Börnichen
- Location within Germany Location within Saxony
- Coordinates: 50°44′58″N 13°8′29″E
- Country: Germany
- State: Saxony
- District: Erzgebirgskreis
- Municipal assoc.: Wildenstein

Government
  - Mayor (2018–25): Frank Lohr

Area
  - Total: 15.48 km^{2} (5.98 sq mi)
- Elevation: 517 m (1,696 ft)

Population (2025-12-31)
  - Total: 947
  - Density: 61.2/km^{2} (158/sq mi)
- Time zone: UTC+01:00 (CET)
  - Summer (DST): UTC+02:00 (CEST)
- Postal codes: 09437
- Dialling codes: 037294
- Vehicle registration: ERZ
- Website: www.boernichen.de

Börnichen is a municipality in the district Erzgebirgskreis, in Saxony, Germany.
