= Hohndorf =

- Municipality
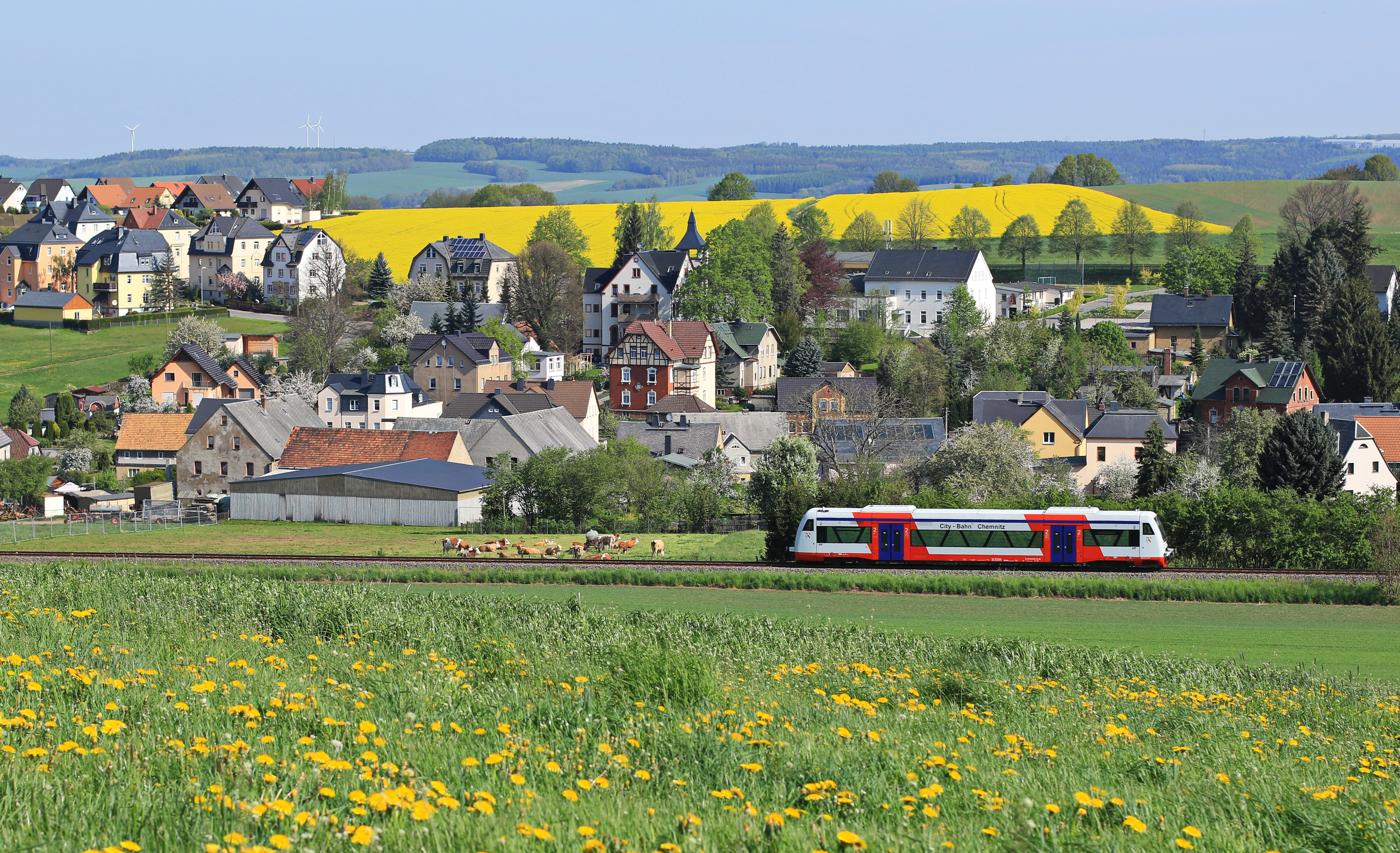

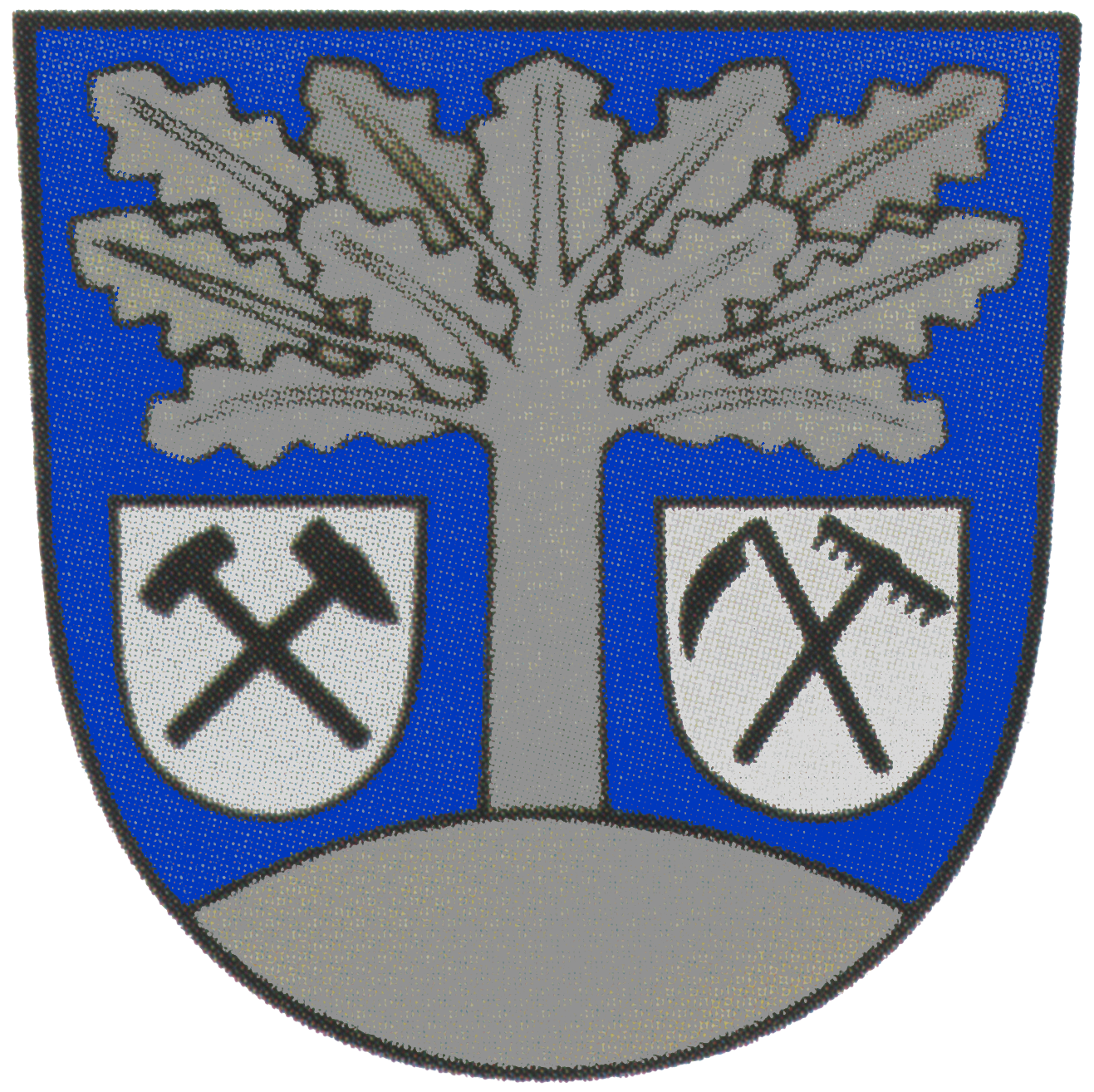
- Coat of arms

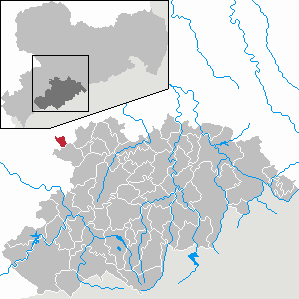
- Location of Hohndorf within Erzgebirgskreis district
- Interactive map of Hohndorf
- Location within Germany Location within Saxony
- Coordinates: 50°44′44″N 12°40′24″E
- Country: Germany
- State: Saxony
- District: Erzgebirgskreis

Government
  - Mayor (2022–29): Lutz Rosenlöcher

Area
  - Total: 5.26 km^{2} (2.03 sq mi)
- Elevation: 363 m (1,191 ft)

Population (2025-12-31)
  - Total: 3,300
  - Density: 630/km^{2} (1,600/sq mi)
- Time zone: UTC+01:00 (CET)
  - Summer (DST): UTC+02:00 (CEST)
- Postal codes: 09394
- Dialling codes: 037298, 037204
- Vehicle registration: ERZ, ANA, ASZ, AU, MAB, MEK, STL, SZB, ZP
- Website: www.hohndorf.com

Hohndorf is a municipality in the district Erzgebirgskreis, in Saxony, Germany.
