= Niederdorf, Saxony =

Niederdorf
- Municipality
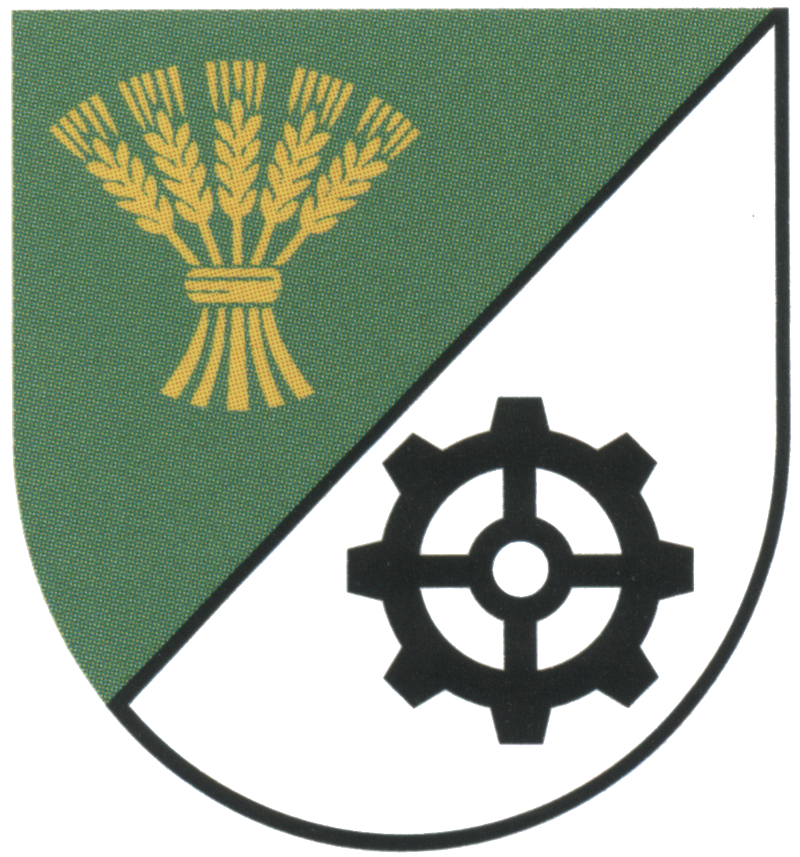
- Coat of arms

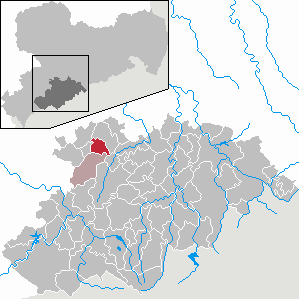
- Location of Niederdorf within Erzgebirgskreis district
- Interactive map of Niederdorf
- Location within Germany Location within Saxony
- Coordinates: 50°43′34″N 12°47′15″E
- Country: Germany
- State: Saxony
- District: Erzgebirgskreis

Government
  - Mayor (2022–29): Stephan Weinrich (CDU)

Area
  - Total: 13.03 km^{2} (5.03 sq mi)
- Elevation: 400 m (1,300 ft)

Population (2025-12-31)
  - Total: 1,254
  - Density: 96.24/km^{2} (249.3/sq mi)
- Time zone: UTC+01:00 (CET)
  - Summer (DST): UTC+02:00 (CEST)
- Postal codes: 09366
- Dialling codes: 037296
- Vehicle registration: ERZ
- Website: www.niederdorf-erzgebirge.de

Niederdorf is a municipality in the district Erzgebirgskreis, in Saxony, Germany.
