= Pfaffroda =

- Ortsteil of Olbernhau
- Interactive map of Pfaffroda
- Location within Germany Location within Saxony
- Coordinates: 50°42′N 13°21′E
- Country: Germany
- State: Saxony
- District: Erzgebirgskreis
- Town: Olbernhau

Area
  - Total: 55.13 km^{2} (21.29 sq mi)
- Elevation: 540 m (1,770 ft)

Population (2015-12-31)
  - Total: 2,471
  - Density: 44.82/km^{2} (116.1/sq mi)
- Time zone: UTC+01:00 (CET)
  - Summer (DST): UTC+02:00 (CEST)
- Postal codes: 09526
- Dialling codes: 037360
- Vehicle registration: ERZ
- Website: www.pfaffroda.de

Pfaffroda (German pronunciation: [pfafˈʁoːda]) is a village and a former municipality in the district Erzgebirgskreis, in Saxony, Germany. Since 1 January 2017, it is part of the town Olbernhau.
