= Zwota =

- Ortsteil of Klingenthal
- Coat of arms
- Interactive map of Zwota
- Location within Germany Location within Saxony
- Coordinates: 50°21′N 12°25′E
- Country: Germany
- State: Saxony
- District: Vogtlandkreis
- Town: Klingenthal

Area
  - Total: 21.78 km^{2} (8.41 sq mi)
- Elevation: 600 m (2,000 ft)

Population (2011-12-31)
  - Total: 1,366
  - Density: 62.72/km^{2} (162.4/sq mi)
- Time zone: UTC+01:00 (CET)
  - Summer (DST): UTC+02:00 (CEST)
- Postal codes: 08267
- Dialling codes: 037467
- Vehicle registration: V
- Website: http://www.zwota.de

Zwota (German pronunciation: [ˈtsvoːta]) is a village and a former municipality in the Vogtlandkreis district, in Saxony, Germany. Since 1 January 2013, it is part of the town Klingenthal.
