= Lößnitz =

- Town
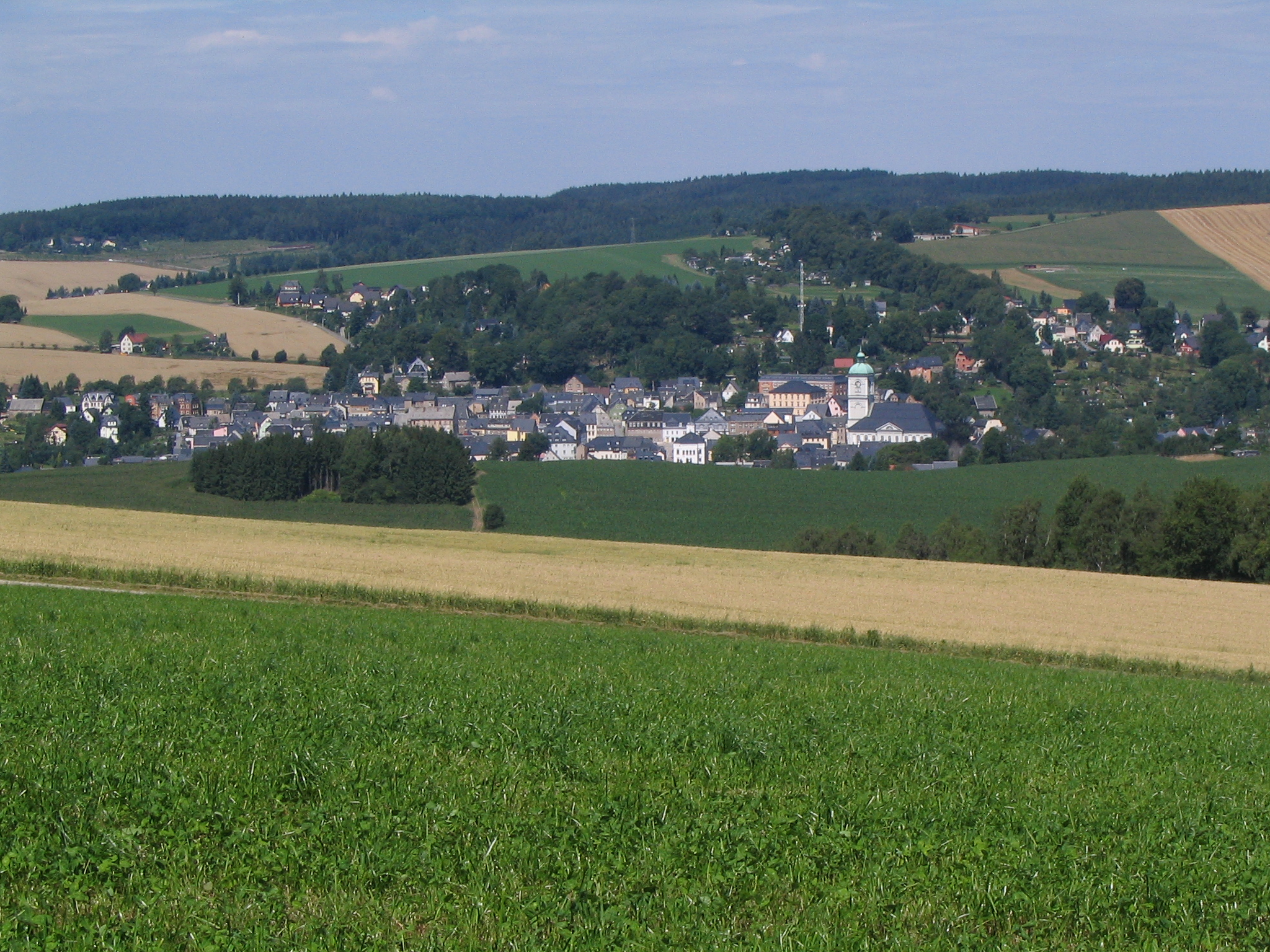
- General view of Lößnitz

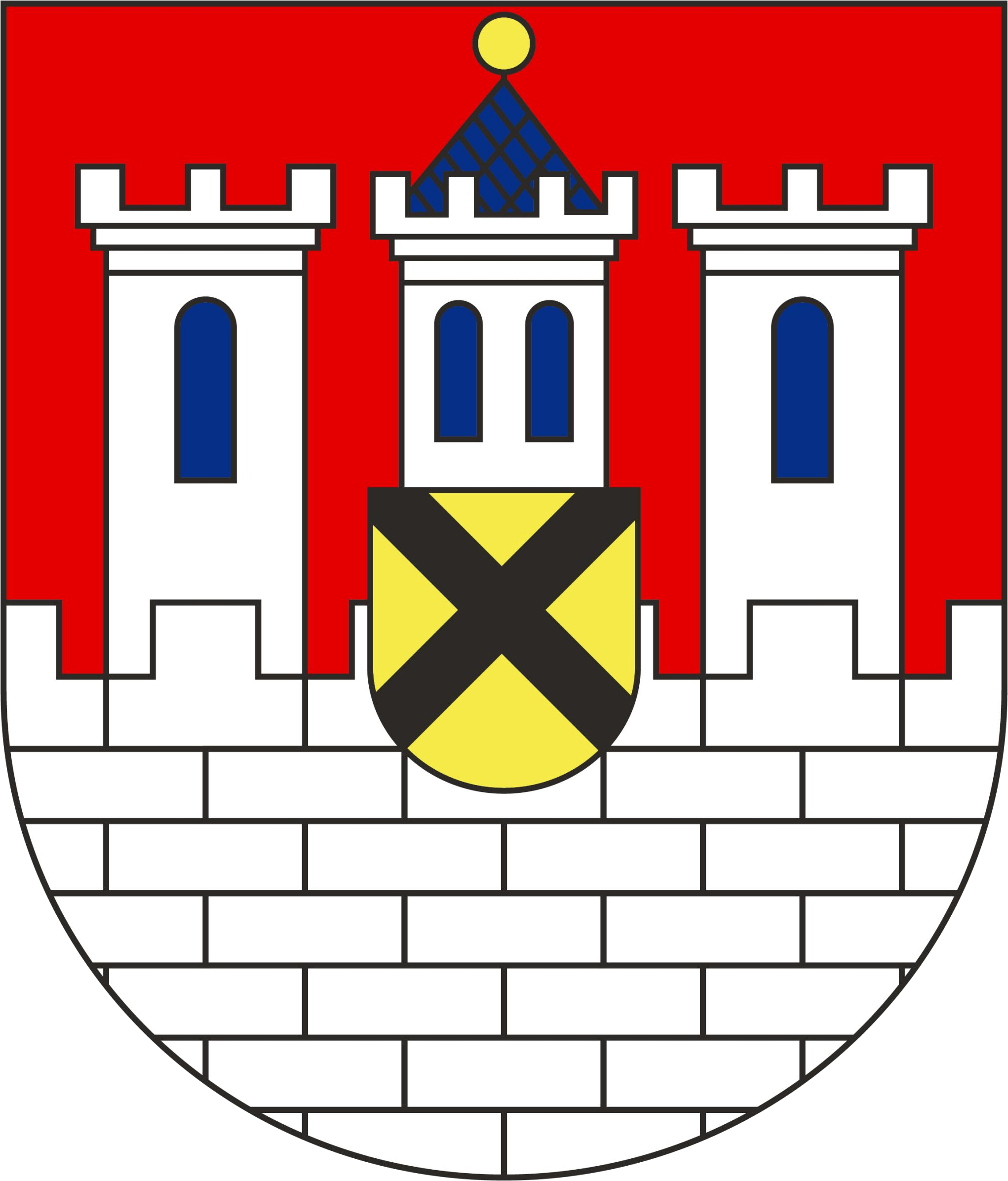
- Coat of arms

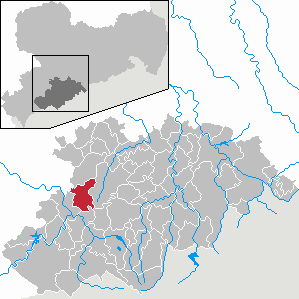
- Location of Lößnitz within Erzgebirgskreis district
- Interactive map of Lößnitz
- Location within Germany Location within Saxony
- Coordinates: 50°37′17″N 12°43′54″E
- Country: Germany
- State: Saxony
- District: Erzgebirgskreis

Government
  - Mayor (2022–29): Alexander Troll (CDU)

Area
  - Total: 30.49 km^{2} (11.77 sq mi)
- Elevation: 422 m (1,385 ft)

Population (2025-12-31)
  - Total: 7,445
  - Density: 244.2/km^{2} (632.4/sq mi)
- Time zone: UTC+01:00 (CET)
  - Summer (DST): UTC+02:00 (CEST)
- Postal codes: 08294
- Dialling codes: 03771
- Vehicle registration: ERZ, ANA, ASZ, AU, MAB, MEK, STL, SZB, ZP
- Website: www.stadt-loessnitz.de

Bergstadt Lößnitz (German pronunciation: [ˈløːsnɪts]; “Mining Town of Lößnitz”, also spelt Lössnitz), sometimes also called Muhme (“Aunt”) for its age, is a town in the district of Erzgebirgskreis, Saxony, Germany, and belongs to the Town League of Silberberg (Städtebund Silberberg). Its name comes from the Slavic lesnice, meaning “forest place”.

== Geography ==
Lößnitz is a small town in the western part of the Ore Mountains lying nestled among wooded mountain ranges in a glen, roughly 432 m above sea level. It lies 4 km northeast of Aue and 27 km southwest of Chemnitz.

=== Constituent communities ===
Lößnitz has six Ortsteile (constituent communities), namely Affalter (since 1999), Dittersdorf (since 1973), Grüna (from 1974 a constituent community of Affalter), Dreihansen (said to have been a self-standing community in 1791), Niederlößnitz (since 1898) and Streitwald (from 1939 a constituent community of Affalter).

== History ==
Lößnitz was founded by the Castle Counts (Burggrafen) at Meißen in 1170, and in a document from 1284 it was already described as a Civitas. The town's first documentary mention, however, had already come in 1238, in which it was named as “Lesnitz the forest place”.

Lößnitz's early history is somewhat speculative. A schoolmaster is mentioned as being in the town in 1304, for instance, leading to the inference that the Lößnitz Latin school was already there then. Likewise, the first known mayor Hermann von Buten appears in the town's history in 1372, leading to further speculation that there must have been a town hall by that time.

In 1382, Lößnitz was designated a Bergstadt and a year later the whole town burnt right down as far as the town mill that stood before the gates. In 1406, the Count of Schönburg acquired the County of Hartenstein and made Lößnitz its seat.

In 1542, the Reformation was introduced. In 1601, the town hall portal appeared and the town hall remodelling was finished six years later. However, all of it was lost, along with the church, the parish building, the school and moreover 108 houses, in the “Rote Ruhr” (“Red Dysentery”, a name given this town fire). In the years that followed, the town also had to deal with sackings, the plague and yet another town fire.

In 1714, the Baroque Hospitalkirche (“Hospital Church”) was consecrated. Town fires were nothing unusual in those days, and on 10 December 1806 it once again came to pass and among the buildings lost were, again, the town hall, the parish building and the school as well as the mediaeval St. Johanniskirche (church), the brewing and malting house, 182 houses and 16 barns. The town sprang back from this, but only three years later, there was yet another fire, this one started by a lightning strike. Of the 104 houses that were destroyed, 26 were ones that had already been rebuilt after burning down in the last fire. On 29 October 1826 the new church, Haupt- und Stadtkirche St. Johannis, was consecrated. There were later further fires in Lößnitz, whereby the Baroque Hospitalkirche was destroyed, too.

After jurisdiction over the town had been relinquished to the House of Schönburg, the Fürstlich Schönburgische Justizamt Stein (“Princely Schönburg Justice Office of Stein”) came into being in 1861, and that same year, the new Hospitalkirche was consecrated. When the Schönburg principalities were taken over by the Kingdom of Saxony in 1878, Lößnitz was given a Kingdom of Saxony Amt court, which persisted until 1931.

In 1917, the bells at both the St. Johanniskirche and the Hospitalkirche were removed for war requirements, but only three years later, the former acquired three new bells. In 1939, a carillon consisting of 23 bronze bells was installed in the church's spire.

On 20 April 1945, the town's deputy mayor Rudolf Weber, who wanted to surrender the town to the Americans without a fight, was shot by the Waffen-SS. From 1952 until 1990, Lößnitz was part of the Bezirk Karl-Marx-Stadt of East Germany. Between 1985 and 1992 there arose on the edge of town a great residential area, where today almost half the town's population lives.

In 1999 came the amalgamation of the community of Affalter.

=== Population development ===
The following population figures refer to 31 December of each given year.

1982 to 1988

- 1982 − 8876
- 1983 − 8780
- 1984 − 8724
- 1985 − 8648
- 1986 − 8500
- 1987 − 8484
- 1988 − 10205

1989 to 1995

- 1989 − 11620
- 1990 − 12270
- 1991 − 12951
- 1992 − 13098
- 1993 − 13056
- 1994 − 12801
- 1995 − 12555

1996 to 2002

- 1996 − 12302
- 1997 − 12041
- 1998 − 11760
- 1999 − 11527
- 2000 − 11262
- 2001 − 11068
- 2002 − 10769

2003 to 2006

- 2003 − 10601
- 2004 − 10479
- 2005 − 10374
- 2006 − 10184

Source: Statistisches Landesamt des Freistaates Sachsen

=== Niederlößnitz ===
Today's constituent community of Niederlößnitz (“Lower Lößnitz”) was originally a farming village downstream from where the Aubach empties into the Lößnitzbach. The first known naming of the community goes back to 1497, when it was known as Niderlesenitzs. About 100 years later, the community counted 6 landowners. One estate was exempted from combat duty and served as the lordly hunting lodge. A. Schuhmann mentioned in 1820 in his Lexikon two flour mills and a paper mill. However, the paper mill, which had supposedly once been a hammerworks and a coin blank works, burnt down in 1808 and was never rebuilt. Towards the end of the 19th century, the railway line between Zwönitz and Aue, on which the lower railway station was built somewhat later, came into service. After the station was built came residential areas and industrial development, leading eventually to Niederlößnitz's amalgamation with the Town of Lößnitz in 1898.

== Politics ==
=== Coat of arms ===
Lößnitz's arms show a black Saint Andrew's cross (the arms of the Castle Counts at Meißen, the town's founders) on a yellow background. The cross is surrounded by three towers set on a stylized wall on a red background. The wall and towers refer to the town's former formidable fortifications; the three towers symbolize the three former town gates.

=== Town partnership ===
Since 1991 there has been a partnership with the Westphalian town of Borgholzhausen.

== Culture and sightseeing ==
=== Buildings ===
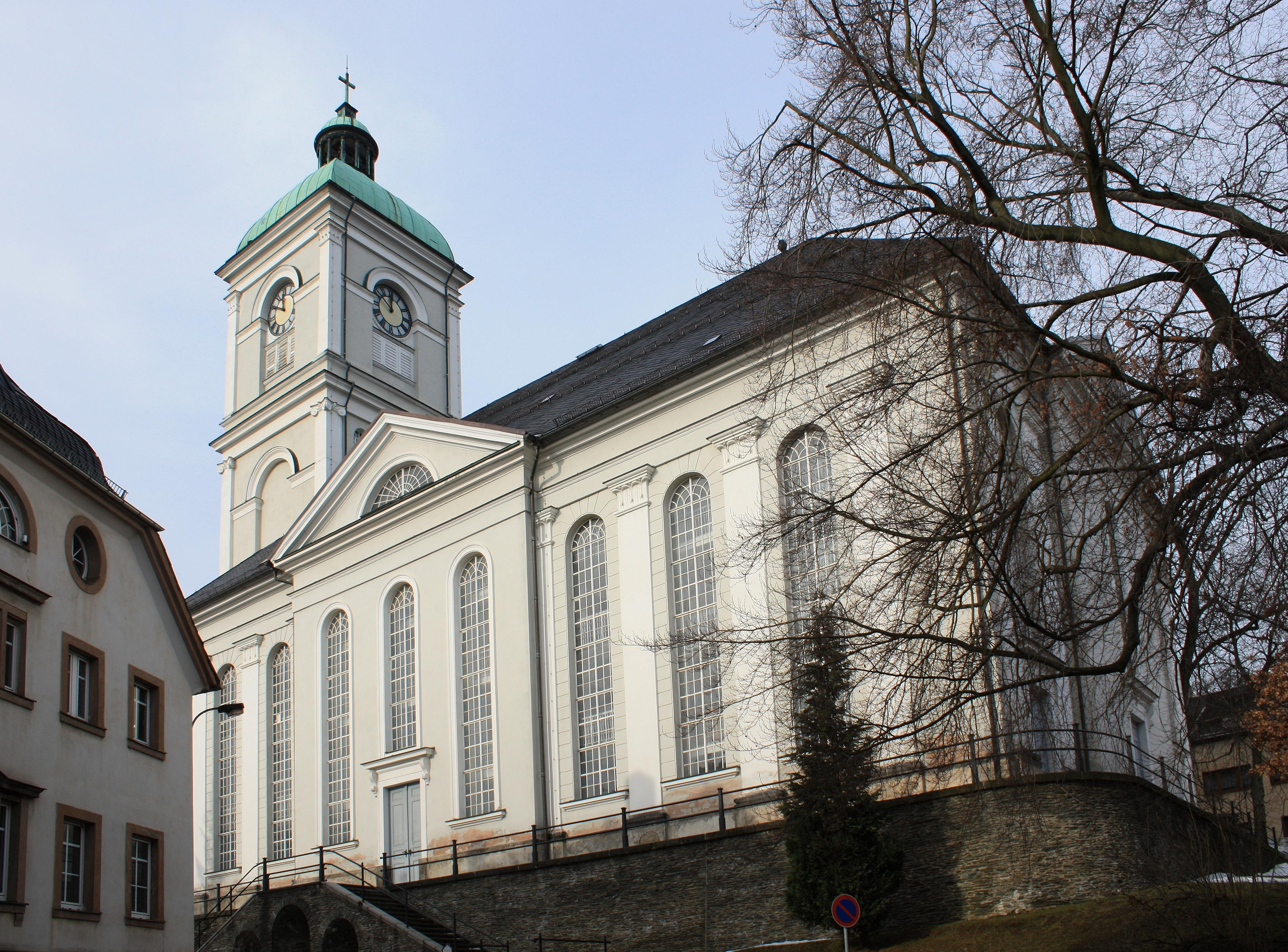
St.Johanniskirche

- Old Town
- Parts of the former town wall (“Rösselturm”)
- Town Hall from 1601
- St. Johanniskirche with carillon. It consists of 23 bells from the Apolda bell foundry Franz Schilling Söhne for a carillon that was dedicated at Whitsun in 1939 by carillon master Bender, musical consultant for the Hitler Youth from the Berliner Parochialkirche. It was to “proclaim the thankfulness that the German people owe their Führer and his movement”. The St. Johanniskirche is the largest neo-classical church in the oremountains.

=== Folk festivals and markets ===
- Weekly market every Thursday
- Dorffest Draffaller (village festival)
- Lößnitzer Salzmarkt (salt market, third weekend in June)
- Naturmarkt (in September)
- Christmas Market (Advent)

== Economy and infrastructure ==
=== Economy ===
Lößnitz was over the centuries a regionally important economic centre with market rights. With widespread industrialization beginning about the year 1850, Lößnitz became one of the most important industrial centres in the western Ore Mountains. Important businesses were in shoemaking, machine building, textile refining and processing and metalware. Slate mining around the town was also important for a long while. German Reunification brought far-reaching changes in the region leading to the loss of a great deal of the local industry.

=== Transport ===
The Bundesstraße 169 runs through the municipal area. The nearest Autobahn interchanges, with Bundesautobahn 72, are in Hartenstein and Stollberg.

Lößnitz lies on the railway line between Chemnitz and Aue (Zwönitztalbahn) and has two railway stations, called oberer Bahnhof and unterer Bahnhof – upper and lower stations. Trains are run by the Erzgebirgsbahn, a daughter operation of Deutsche Bahn AG. For local transport – in the case of buslines that serve Lößnitz – the fare structure of the Verkehrsverbund Mittelsachsen (“Middle Saxony Transport Association”) applies.
