= Amtsberg =

- Municipality
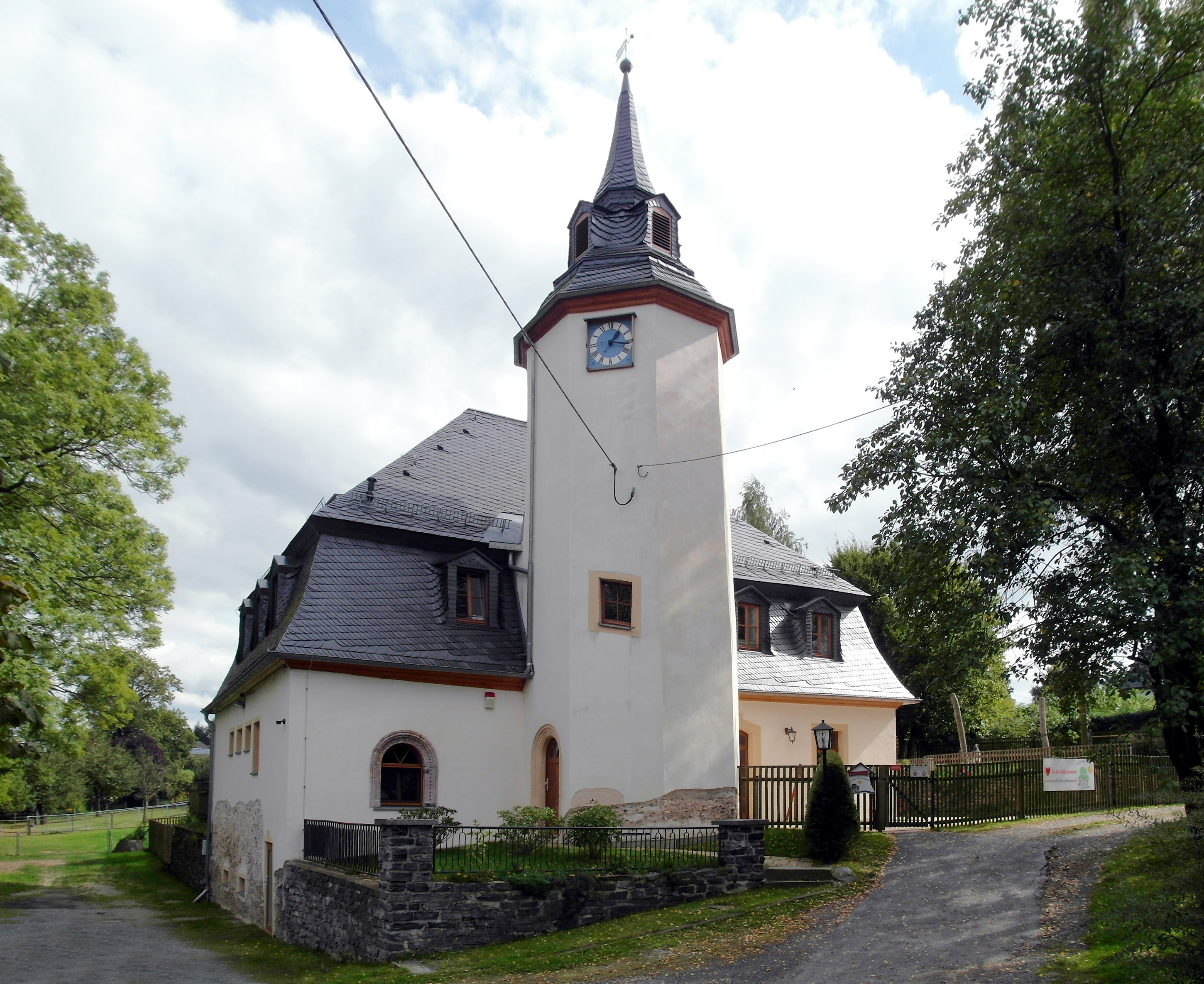
- Old manor house

- Coat of arms

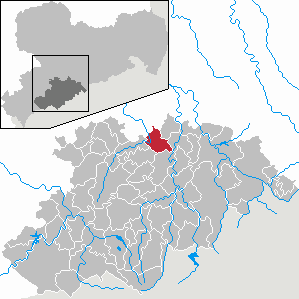
- Location of Amtsberg within Erzgebirgskreis district
- Interactive map of Amtsberg
- Location within Germany Location within Saxony
- Coordinates: 50°44′N 13°0′E
- Country: Germany
- State: Saxony
- District: Erzgebirgskreis
- Subdivisions: 4

Government
  - Mayor (2022–29): Sylvio Krause (CDU)

Area
  - Total: 23.23 km^{2} (8.97 sq mi)
- Elevation: 440 m (1,440 ft)

Population (2025-12-31)
  - Total: 3,573
  - Density: 153.8/km^{2} (398.4/sq mi)
- Time zone: UTC+01:00 (CET)
  - Summer (DST): UTC+02:00 (CEST)
- Postal codes: 09439
- Dialling codes: Dittersdorf 037209 / Weißbach/Schlößchen 03725
- Vehicle registration: ERZ
- Website: www.gemeinde-amtsberg.de

Amtsberg is a municipality in the district Erzgebirgskreis, in Saxony, Germany.

== Historical population ==
The following figures correspond to the population as of 31 December within the municipality borders as of January 2007:

1982 to 1988

- 1982: 4731
- 1983: 4664
- 1984: 4645
- 1985: 4536
- 1986: 4482
- 1987: 4377
- 1988: 4294

1989 to 1995

- 1989: 4207
- 1990: 4181
- 1991: 4062
- 1992: 4020
- 1993: 4024
- 1994: 4047
- 1995: 4069

1996 to 2002

- 1996: 4219
- 1997: 4301
- 1998: 4296
- 1999: 4289
- 2000: 4341
- 2001: 4349
- 2002: 4369

2003 to 2009

- 2003: 4348
- 2004: 4291
- 2005: 4253
- 2006: 4185
- 2007: 4144
- 2008: 4117
- 2009: 4062

2012 to 2013

- 2012: 3879
- 2013: 3847

Source: Statistical office of Saxony
