= Oelsnitz, Erzgebirge =

Oelsnitz
- Town
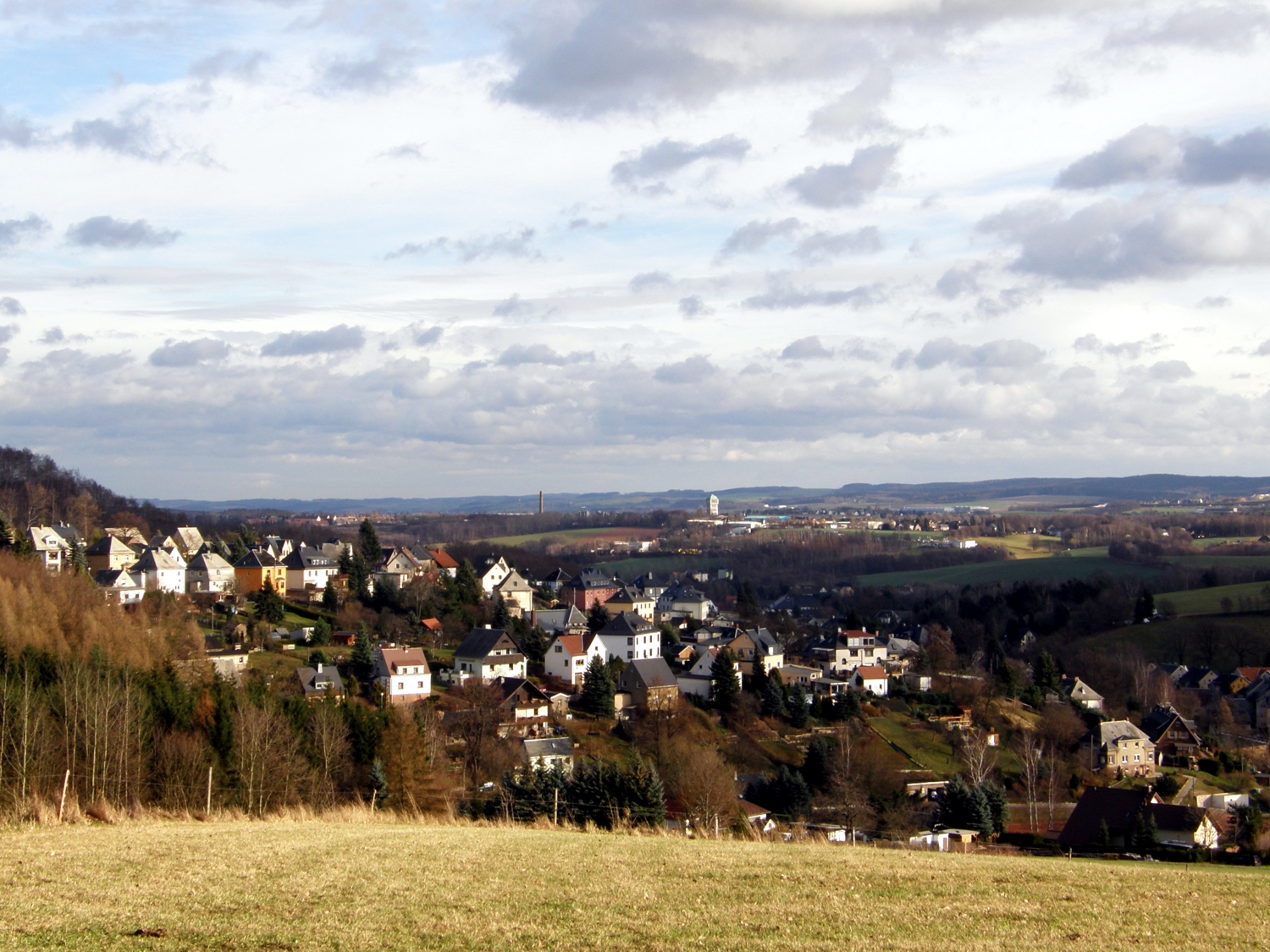

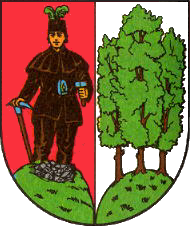
- Coat of arms

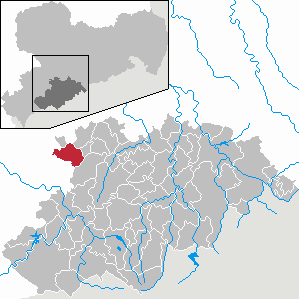
- Location of Oelsnitz within Erzgebirgskreis district
- Interactive map of Oelsnitz
- Location within Germany Location within Saxony
- Coordinates: 50°43′20″N 12°41′55″E
- Country: Germany
- State: Saxony
- District: Erzgebirgskreis
- Subdivisions: 6

Government
  - Mayor (2022–29): Thomas Lein (SPD)

Area
  - Total: 26.28 km^{2} (10.15 sq mi)
- Elevation: 330–491 m (1,083–1,611 ft)

Population (2025-12-31)
  - Total: 10,782
  - Density: 410.3/km^{2} (1,063/sq mi)
- Time zone: UTC+01:00 (CET)
  - Summer (DST): UTC+02:00 (CEST)
- Postal codes: 09376
- Dialling codes: 037298
- Vehicle registration: ERZ, ANA, ASZ, AU, MAB, MEK, STL, SZB, ZP
- Website: www.oelsnitz-erzgeb.de

Oelsnitz (German pronunciation: [ˈœlsnɪts]) is a town in the district Erzgebirgskreis, in Saxony, Germany. It is situated 14 km east of Zwickau, and 20 km southwest of Chemnitz. Between 1844 and 1971 hardcoal was mined in Oelsnitz and the surrounding towns. The major mine "Karl-Liebknecht" became a mining museum in 1986.

== Twin towns — sister cities ==
Oelsnitz is twinned with:

- Avion, France (1961)
- Mimoň, Czech Republic (1968)
- Sprockhövel, Germany (2000)
- Chodov, Czech Republic (2004)

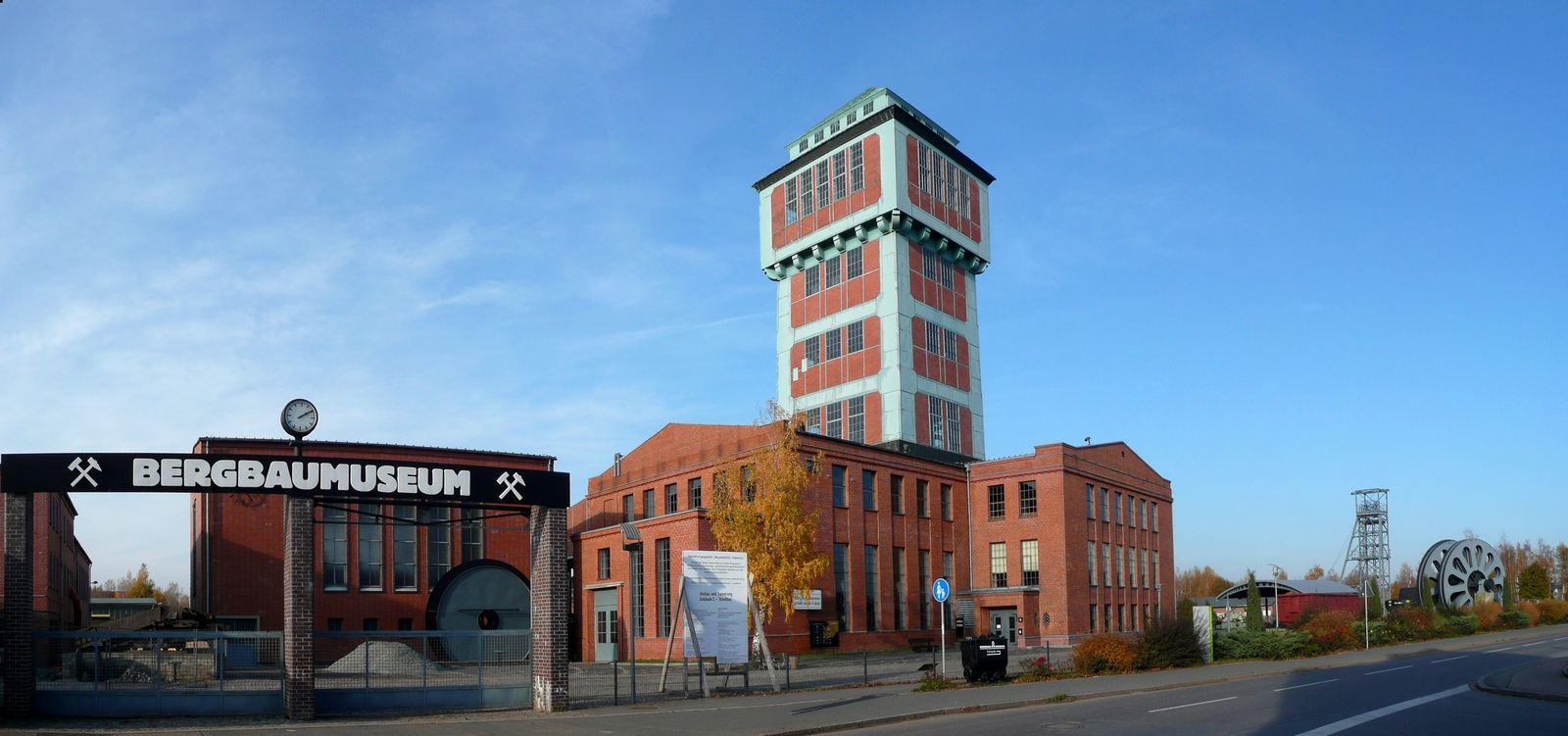
Coal Mining Museum in Oelsnitz
