= Gornau =

- Municipality
- Coat of arms

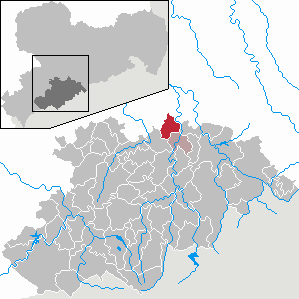
- Location of Gornau within Erzgebirgskreis district
- Interactive map of Gornau
- Location within Germany Location within Saxony
- Coordinates: 50°45′31″N 13°2′13″E
- Country: Germany
- State: Saxony
- District: Erzgebirgskreis
- Subdivisions: 3

Government
  - Mayor (2022–29): Nico Wollnitzke (CDU)

Area
  - Total: 19.87 km^{2} (7.67 sq mi)
- Elevation: 445 m (1,460 ft)

Population (2025-12-31)
  - Total: 3,659
  - Density: 184.1/km^{2} (476.9/sq mi)
- Time zone: UTC+01:00 (CET)
  - Summer (DST): UTC+02:00 (CEST)
- Postal codes: 09405, 09437 (Witzschdorf), 09573 (Dittmannsdorf)
- Dialling codes: 03725
- Vehicle registration: ERZ

Gornau is a municipality in the district Erzgebirgskreis, in Saxony, Germany.

== Subdivisions ==
Gornau has three subdivisions:

- Gornau
- Dittmannsdorf
- Witzschdorf

== Politics ==
=== Municipal Council ===
The local council of Gornau has 14 seats. Since the local elections of 2014, the CDU eight seats, the Alliance of Free Voters four seats, Left one seat and the SPD one seat, too.

=== Mayor ===
- 1990–1996: Rolf Hänel (neutral)
- 1996–1997: Manfred Zähler (sitting mayor)
- 1997–2001: Gerhard Olschewski (neutral)
- 2001–2015: Johanna Vogler (CDU)
- since 2015: Nico Wollnitzke (CDU)

== Education ==
- Primary school Gornau

== Twin towns ==
Gornau is twinned with Apensen and Ploërmel.

== Honorary citizens ==
- Eckhard Börner (born 1951), politician (CDU), mayor of Witzschdorf, MdL (member of the state assembly)
- Harald Sturm (born 1956 in Witzschdorf), former enduro rider and quadruple European Champion
