= Tannenberg, Saxony =

Tannenberg
- Municipality
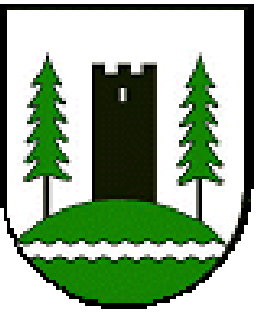
- Coat of arms

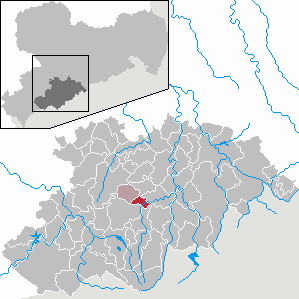
- Location of Tannenberg within Erzgebirgskreis district
- Interactive map of Tannenberg
- Location within Germany Location within Saxony
- Coordinates: 50°36′24″N 12°56′57″E
- Country: Germany
- State: Saxony
- District: Erzgebirgskreis
- Subdivisions: 2

Government
  - Mayor (2022–29): Christoph Neubert

Area
  - Total: 7.94 km^{2} (3.07 sq mi)
- Elevation: 470–620 m (1,540–2,030 ft)

Population (2025-12-31)
  - Total: 1,008
  - Density: 127/km^{2} (329/sq mi)
- Time zone: UTC+01:00 (CET)
  - Summer (DST): UTC+02:00 (CEST)
- Postal codes: 09468
- Dialling codes: 03733
- Vehicle registration: ERZ, ANA, ASZ, AU, MAB, MEK, STL, SZB, ZP
- Website: www.gemeinde-tannenberg.de

Tannenberg is a municipality in the district of Erzgebirgskreis in Saxony in Germany.

== History ==
From 1952 to 1990, Tannenberg was part of the Bezirk Karl-Marx-Stadt of East Germany.
