= Gornsdorf =

- Municipality
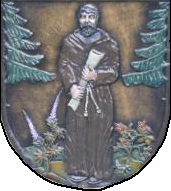
- Coat of arms

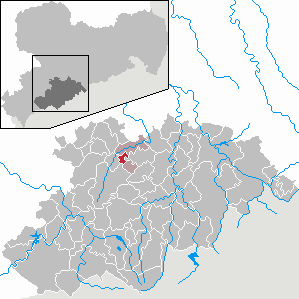
- Location of Gornsdorf within Erzgebirgskreis district
- Interactive map of Gornsdorf
- Location within Germany Location within Saxony
- Coordinates: 50°42′24″N 12°52′59″E
- Country: Germany
- State: Saxony
- District: Erzgebirgskreis

Government
  - Mayor (2020–27): Andrea Arnold (CDU)

Area
  - Total: 4.18 km^{2} (1.61 sq mi)
- Elevation: 502 m (1,647 ft)

Population (2025-12-31)
  - Total: 1,889
  - Density: 452/km^{2} (1,170/sq mi)
- Time zone: UTC+01:00 (CET)
  - Summer (DST): UTC+02:00 (CEST)
- Postal codes: 09390
- Dialling codes: 03721
- Vehicle registration: ERZ, ANA, ASZ, AU, MAB, MEK, STL, SZB, ZP
- Website: www.gornsdorf.de

Gornsdorf is a municipality in the district Erzgebirgskreis, in Saxony, Germany. With a population of approximately 2,266 as of recent records. Gornsdorf offers traditional German cuisine.
