= Mildenau =

- Municipality
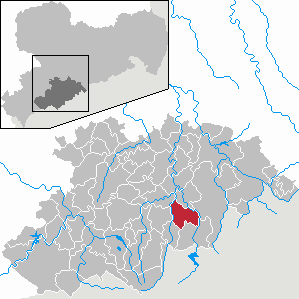
- Location of Mildenau within Erzgebirgskreis district
- Interactive map of Mildenau
- Location within Germany Location within Saxony
- Coordinates: 50°35′59″N 13°4′8″E
- Country: Germany
- State: Saxony
- District: Erzgebirgskreis
- Subdivisions: 5

Government
  - Mayor (2020–27): Andreas Mauersberger

Area
  - Total: 31.67 km^{2} (12.23 sq mi)
- Elevation: 515 m (1,690 ft)

Population (2025-12-31)
  - Total: 3,292
  - Density: 103.9/km^{2} (269.2/sq mi)
- Time zone: UTC+01:00 (CET)
  - Summer (DST): UTC+02:00 (CEST)
- Postal codes: 09456
- Dialling codes: 03733
- Vehicle registration: ERZ, ANA, ASZ, AU, MAB, MEK, STL, SZB, ZP
- Website: www.gemeinde-mildenau.de

Mildenau is a municipality in the district of Erzgebirgskreis, in Saxony, Germany.

== History ==
From 1952 to 1990, Mildenau was part of the Bezirk Karl-Marx-Stadt of East Germany.
