= Neukirchen, Erzgebirgskreis =

Neukirchen
- Municipality
- Coat of arms

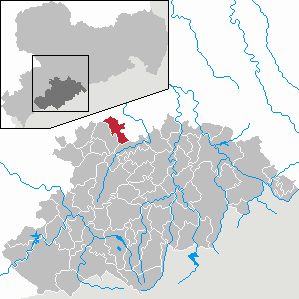
- Location of Neukirchen within Erzgebirgskreis district
- Interactive map of Neukirchen
- Location within Germany Location within Saxony
- Coordinates: 50°46′46″N 12°52′01″E
- Country: Germany
- State: Saxony
- District: Erzgebirgskreis

Government
  - Mayor (2022–29): Sascha Thamm

Area
  - Total: 20.14 km^{2} (7.78 sq mi)
- Elevation: 350 m (1,150 ft)

Population (2025-12-31)
  - Total: 6,846
  - Density: 339.9/km^{2} (880.4/sq mi)
- Time zone: UTC+01:00 (CET)
  - Summer (DST): UTC+02:00 (CEST)
- Postal codes: 09221
- Dialling codes: 0371
- Vehicle registration: ERZ, ANA, ASZ, AU, MAB, MEK, STL, SZB, ZP
- Website: www.neukirchen-erzgebirge.de

Neukirchen (German pronunciation: [nɔʏˈkɪʁçn̩]) is a municipality in the district Erzgebirgskreis, in Saxony, Germany.
