= Burkhardtsdorf =

- Municipality
- Coat of arms

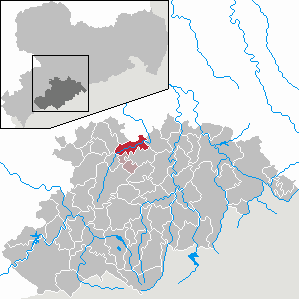
- Location of Burkhardtsdorf within Erzgebirgskreis district
- Interactive map of Burkhardtsdorf
- Location within Germany Location within Saxony
- Coordinates: 50°44′5″N 12°55′19″E
- Country: Germany
- State: Saxony
- District: Erzgebirgskreis
- Subdivisions: 4

Government
  - Mayor (2020–27): Jörg Spiller

Area
  - Total: 21.19 km^{2} (8.18 sq mi)
- Elevation: 400–520 m (1,310–1,710 ft)

Population (2025-12-31)
  - Total: 5,845
  - Density: 275.8/km^{2} (714.4/sq mi)
- Time zone: UTC+01:00 (CET)
  - Summer (DST): UTC+02:00 (CEST)
- Postal codes: 09235
- Dialling codes: 03721/037209
- Vehicle registration: ERZ
- Website: www.burkhardtsdorf.de

Burkhardtsdorf is a municipality in the Erzgebirgskreis district, Saxony, Germany.
