= Chemnitz (region) =

Coordinates: 50°45′N 12°50′E

Chemnitz Direktionsbezirk Chemnitz
- Direktionsbezirk
- Map of Saxony highlighting the former Direktionsbezirk of Chemnitz
- Country: Germany
- State: Saxony
- Disestablished: 1 March 2012
- Region seat: Chemnitz

Area
  - Total: 6,522 km^{2} (2,518 sq mi)

Population (31 Dec. 2010)
  - Total: 1,526,091
  - Density: 234.0/km^{2} (606.0/sq mi)

GDP
  - Total: €50.776 billion (2024)
  - Per capita: €36,635 (2024)
- Website: www.ldc.sachsen.de

Chemnitz (German pronunciation: [ˈkɛmnɪt͡s]) was one of the three former Direktionsbezirke of Saxony, Germany, located in the south-west of the state. It coincided with the Planungsregion Südsachsen. It was disbanded in March 2012.

== History ==
The Direktionsbezirk Chemnitz came into existence on 1 August 2008, and succeeded the Regierungsbezirk Chemnitz. The territory of the Regierungsbezirk Chemnitz was slightly smaller, and excluded the former district of Döbeln.

== Subdivision ==
Kreise
(districts)

1. Erzgebirgskreis
2. Mittelsachsen
3. Vogtlandkreis
4. Zwickau

Kreisfreie Städte
(district-free towns)

1. Chemnitz

== See also ==
- Bezirk Karl-Marx-Stadt
