= Erzgebirgskreis =

Coordinates: 50°36′N 12°57′E

- District
- Flag Coat of arms
- Country: Germany
- State: Saxony
- Founded: 2008
- Capital: Annaberg-Buchholz

Government
  - District admin.: Rico Anton (CDU)

Area
  - Total: 1,828.35 km^{2} (705.93 sq mi)

Population (31 December 2025)
  - Total: 315,274
  - Density: 172.436/km^{2} (446.608/sq mi)
- Time zone: UTC+01:00 (CET)
  - Summer (DST): UTC+02:00 (CEST)
- Vehicle registration: ERZ, ANA, ASZ, AU, MAB, MEK, STL, SZB, ZP
- Website: www.erzgebirgskreis.de

Erzgebirgskreis (Note: German pronunciation: [ˈeːɐ̯t͡sɡəbɪʁksˌkʁaɪ̯s/, /ˈɛʁt͡s-]) is a district (Kreis) in the Free State of Saxony, Germany. It is named after the Ore Mountains (German: Erzgebirge), a mountain range in the southern part of the district which forms part of the Germany–Czech Republic border. It borders (from the west and clockwise) the districts of Vogtlandkreis and Zwickau, the urban district Chemnitz, the district Mittelsachsen and the Czech Republic.

== History ==
The district was established by merging the former districts of Annaberg, Aue-Schwarzenberg, Stollberg and Mittlerer Erzgebirgskreis as part of the district reform of August 2008.

== Geography ==
The district contains the western part of the Ore Mountains, which also forms the border with the Czech Republic. Several rivers that rise in the Erzgebirge flow through the district, including Zwickauer Mulde and Zschopau.

== Sister districts ==
The Erzgebirgskreis has partnerships with the following districts:

- Nürnberger Land, Bavaria, Germany (1990)
- Neustadt (Aisch)-Bad Windsheim, Bavaria, Germany (1990)
- Emmendingen, Baden-Württemberg, Germany (1990)
- Ansbach, Bavaria, Germany (1991)
- Kaohsiung, Taiwan (1993)
- Kalisz Pomorski, Poland (2004)

== Towns and municipalities ==
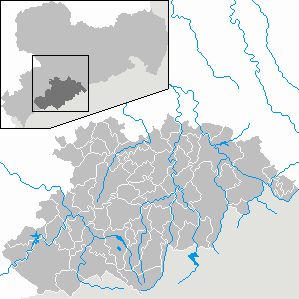
Clickable map of towns and municipalities in the district

Towns
Municipalities
1. Annaberg-Buchholz
2. Aue-Bad Schlema
3. Ehrenfriedersdorf
4. Eibenstock
5. Elterlein
6. Geyer
7. Grünhain-Beierfeld
8. Johanngeorgenstadt
9. Jöhstadt
10. Lauter-Bernsbach
11. Lößnitz
12. Lugau
13. Marienberg
14. Oberwiesenthal
15. Oelsnitz
16. Olbernhau
17. Pockau-Lengefeld
18. Schneeberg
19. Schwarzenberg
20. Scheibenberg
21. Schlettau
22. Stollberg
23. Thalheim
24. Thum
25. Wolkenstein
26. Zschopau
27. Zwönitz
1. Amtsberg
2. Auerbach
3. Bärenstein
4. Bockau
5. Breitenbrunn
6. Burkhardtsdorf
7. Crottendorf
8. Deutschneudorf
9. Drebach
10. Gelenau
11. Gornau
12. Gornsdorf
13. Großolbersdorf
14. Großrückerswalde
15. Heidersdorf
16. Hohndorf
17. Jahnsdorf
18. Königswalde
19. Mildenau
20. Niederdorf
21. Neukirchen
22. Niederwürschnitz
23. Raschau-Markersbach
24. Schönheide
25. Sehmatal
26. Seiffen
27. Stützengrün
28. Tannenberg
29. Thermalbad Wiesenbad
30. Zschorlau

Verwaltungsverband

Wildenstein

1. Börnichen
2. Grünhainichen^{1}
^{1}seat of the Verwaltungsverband;
