= Thumer Netz =

Coordinates: 50.6688°N 12.9521°E

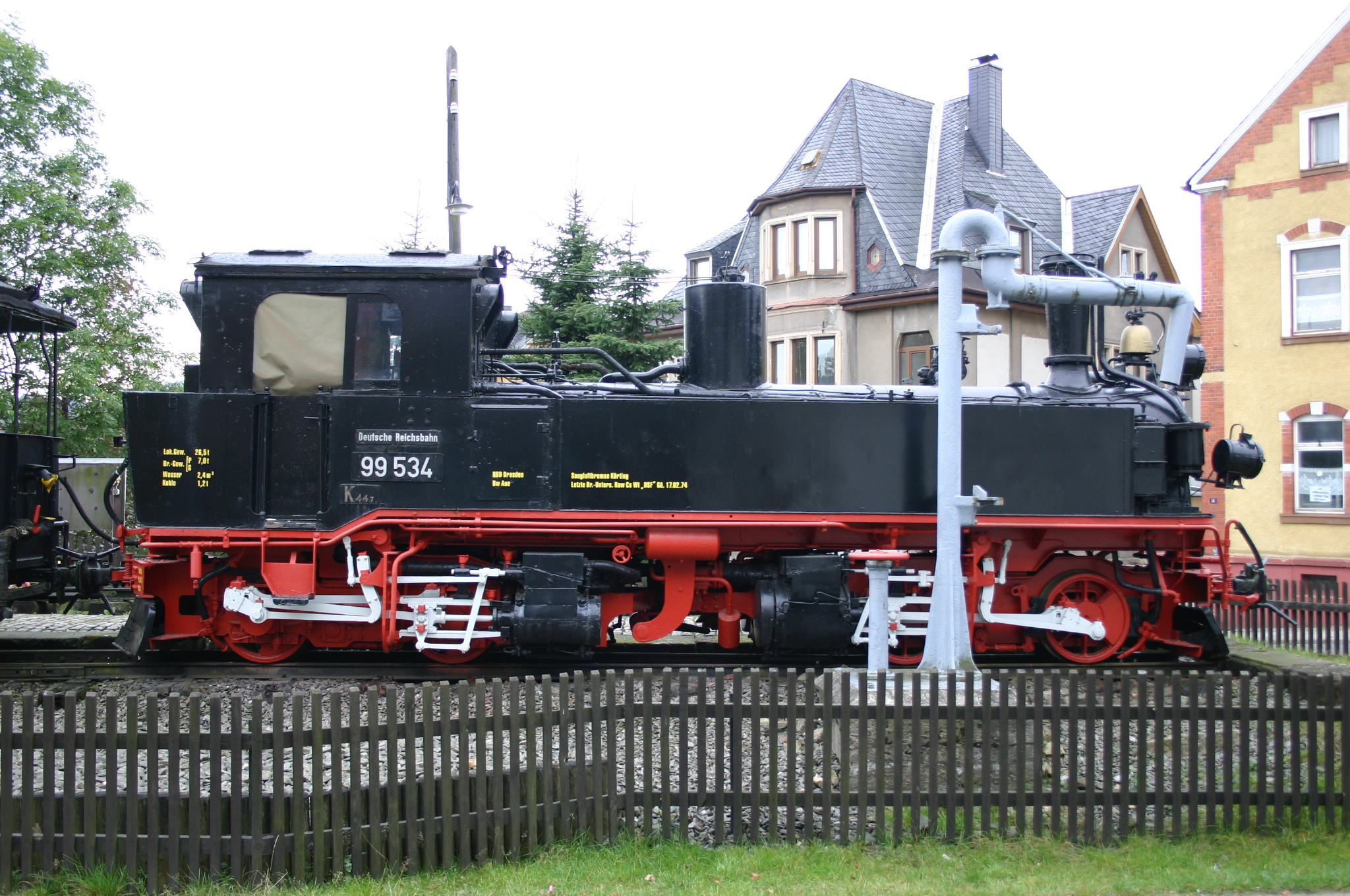
- Saxon IV K 99 534 at the train memorial in Geyer

Overview
- Line number: 6971/6972
- Termini: Wilischthal Schönfeld-Wiesa; Meinersdorf

Service
- Type: narrow gauge rail way
- Operator(s): Royal Saxon State Railways, Deutsche Reichsbahn, DR
- Depot(s): Thum, Geyer

History
- Opened: December 15, 1886
- Closed: December 31, 1975

Technical
- Line length: 44 km (27.34 mi)
- Track gauge: 750 mm (2 ft 5 1/2 in)
- Minimum radius: 50 m (164.0 ft)
- Operating speed: 30 km/h (19 mph)
- Maximum incline: 34 ‰
Route map
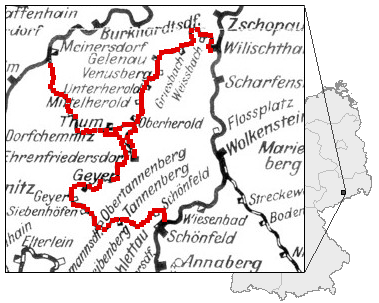

The Thumer Netz was a narrow gauge railway network in the area around Thum in Saxony, Germany that operated from 1886 until 1975. It had a 750 mm (2 ft 5 1/2 in) gauge. Total length was about 44 km (27.34 mi).

This network had three segments that connected three standard gauge stations: In Wilischthal and Schönfeld-Wiesa were connections to the Annaberg-Buchholz-Flöha railway, and in Meinersdorf was a connection to the Chemnitz–Adorf railway. The three segments had their hub in Thum. This set of railroads brought much-needed connectivity and transport capacity to the small towns and villages of the central Ore Mountains, which had formed a viable industry in the 19th century due to abundance of water power, wood, ore and other natural resources as well as cheap labour.

A landmark was the 180 m (590.6 ft) long and 35 m (114.8 ft) tall Greifenbach viaduct between Ehrenfriedersdorf and Geyer.

== History ==
=== Wilischthal-Thum ===
This was the first segment to be finished for the Thumer Netz. Construction started in September 1885, and operations started on December 15, 1886. Length of this segment was 13.54 km (8.41 mi). The track started at the Wilischthal station in Zschopau on the Annaberg-Buchholz–Flöha railway, located in the Zschopau valley, and wound its way along the Wilisch river through Wilischau, Grießbach, Venusberg and Herold into Thum.

This segment operated until 1972. The tracks between the paper mill in Wilischthal and Thum were slowly demolished in the following years. The short remaining section operated until 1992 as an industrial siding, connecting the paper mill with the regular gauge tracks in Zschopau. This short section of tracks still exists today, but is in unusable condition.

=== Schönfeld-Wiesa-Thum ===
This segment was opened in 1888 and featured the Greifenbachtal bridge, at the time one of the largest narrow gauge bridges in Germany. The initial segment started in Schönfeld-Wiesa and ran via Tannenberg to Geyer, parallel to the roadway between the towns. In Geyer the tracks made a wide 180 degree turn through the middle of town to arrive at the station in Geyer. In 1906 the track was extended to Ehrenfriedersdorf and Thum, which obsoleted the short connection between Herold and Ehrenfriedersdorf on the Wilischthal-Thum segment. In Thum, a new station was built to connect the new railway to the already existing segment.

Passenger service operated until 1968. Sections were dismantled over the following years. After 1972, only the short distance from Schönfeld-Wiesa to the paper mill was still being used as an industrial siding. In 1985, this short section was upgraded to regular gauge tracks.

=== Thum-Meinersdorf ===
This segment of the Thumer Netz was finished in 1911 and connected the existing two segments with the Chemnitz–Adorf railway. Starting from Thum, the track went uphill via the neighboring Jahnsbach into Hormersdorf and from there downhill again via Auerbach and Gornsdorf into the Meinersdorf station. Total track length was 12.5 km (approx. 8 miles). By the early 1970s the tracks were in relative disrepair and had many slow zones. Last passenger operation was in 1974 and the track was dismantled in 1976, which marked the end of the Thumer Netz.

== Rolling stock ==
=== Locomotives ===
When the first narrow gauge locomotives were delivered to the Royal Saxon State Railways by the Sächsische Maschinenfabrik in Chemnitz, there was no official type system yet. The letter K (for German klein - small) was appended to existing types to indicate them as narrow gauge locomotives.

The first segment between Wilischthal and Thum was opened in 1886 with three Saxon I K, serial 25, 26 and 27. Some more locomotives of this type were used between Schonfeld-Wiesa and Geyer, but due to the lack of power they were soon replaced by the Saxon III K. This type had sufficient power for the windy and step tracks, but because of their complicated design, starting in 1892 they were replaced by the Saxon IV K, which went on to become the most numerous narrow gauge locomotive in Germany.

After reinforcement of the track bed and bridges, in 1925 the first superheated locomotives of type Saxon VI K were tested, by 1928 as many as 13 of this type operated on the Thumer Netz. In the summer of 1933 the first Einheitsdampflokomotive of the DRG Class 99.73–76 showed up around Thum.

After World War II, starting in 1953 the network was equipped with the Neubaulokomotive of the DR Class 99.77-79. This type ran on the Thumer Netz until it was shut down.

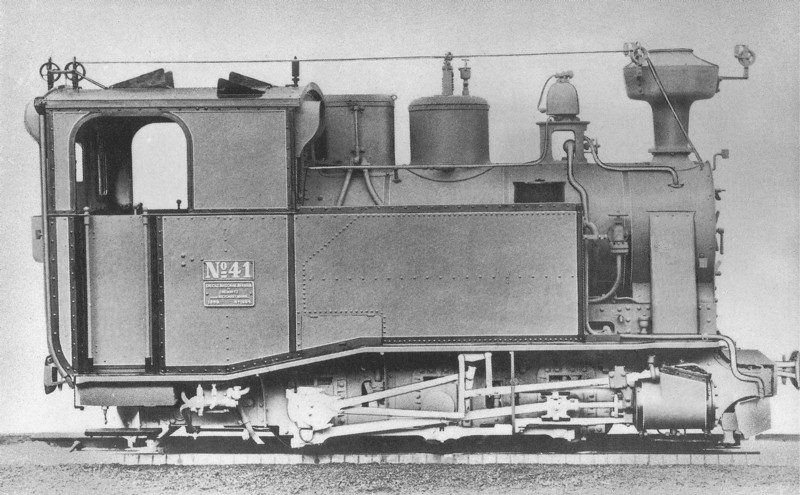
Saxon I K

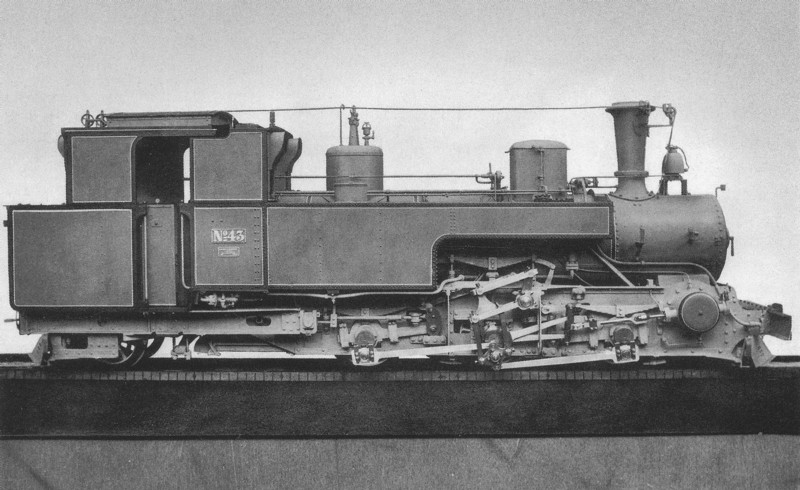
Saxon III K

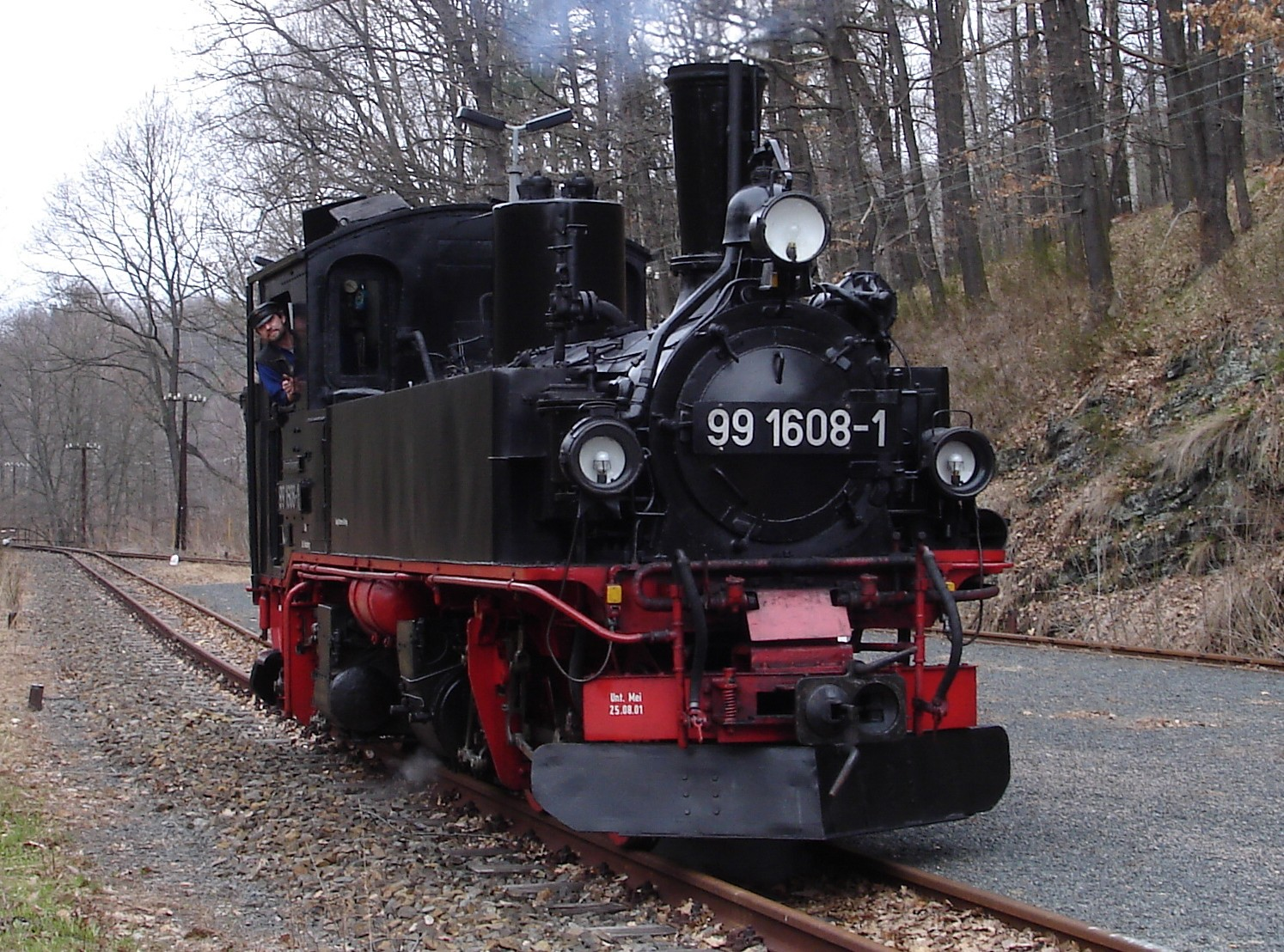
Saxon IV K

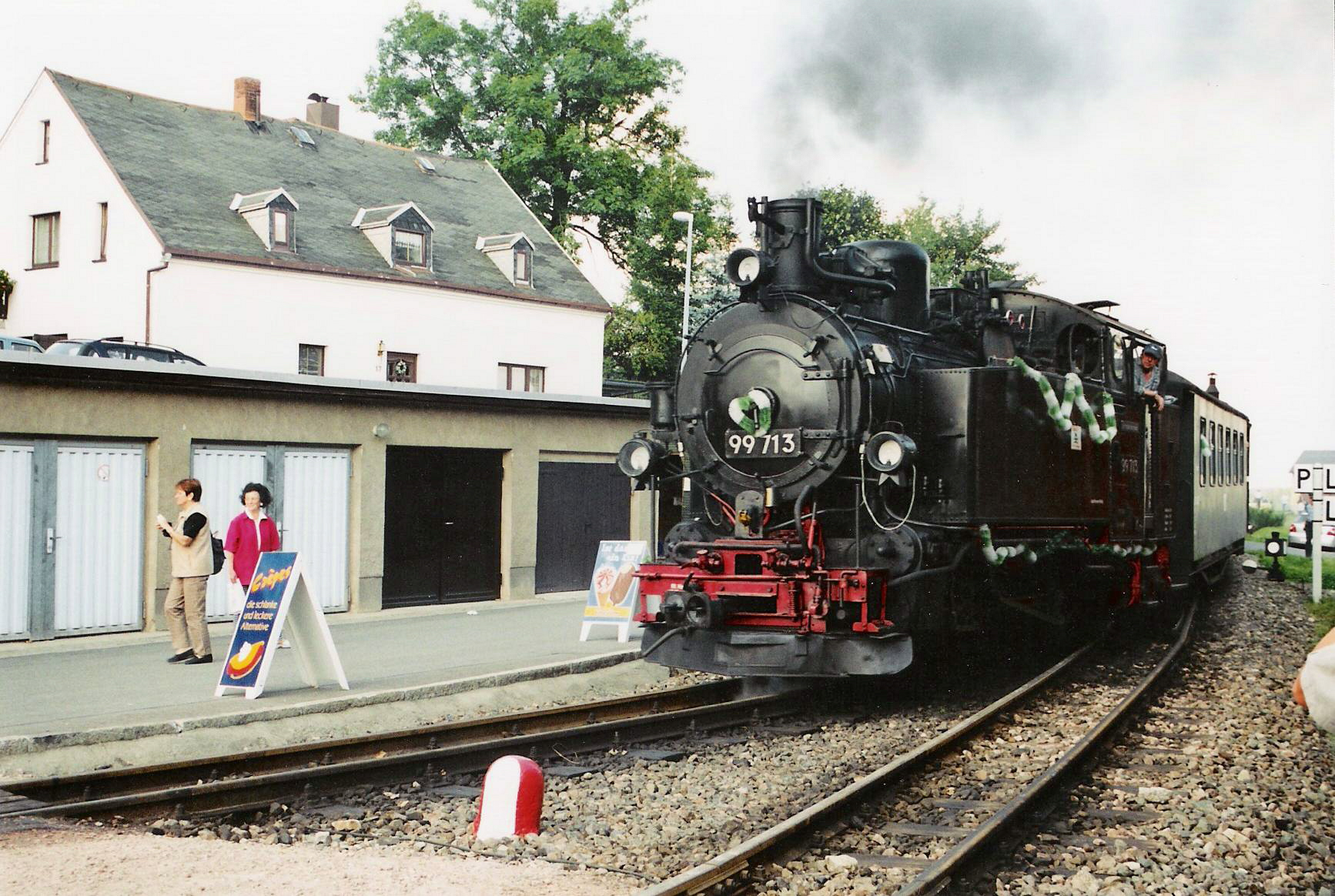
Saxon VI K

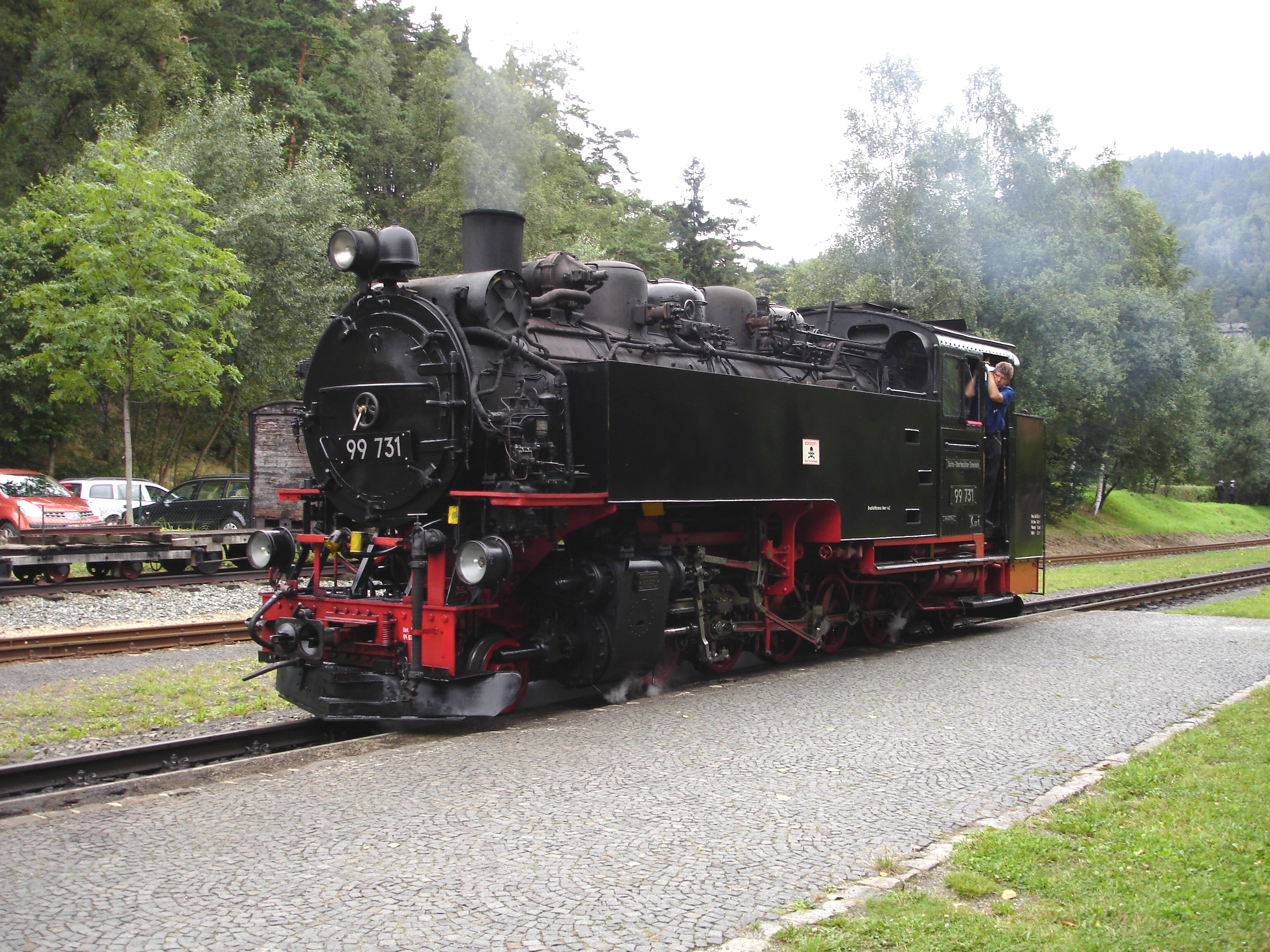
DRG Class 99.73–76

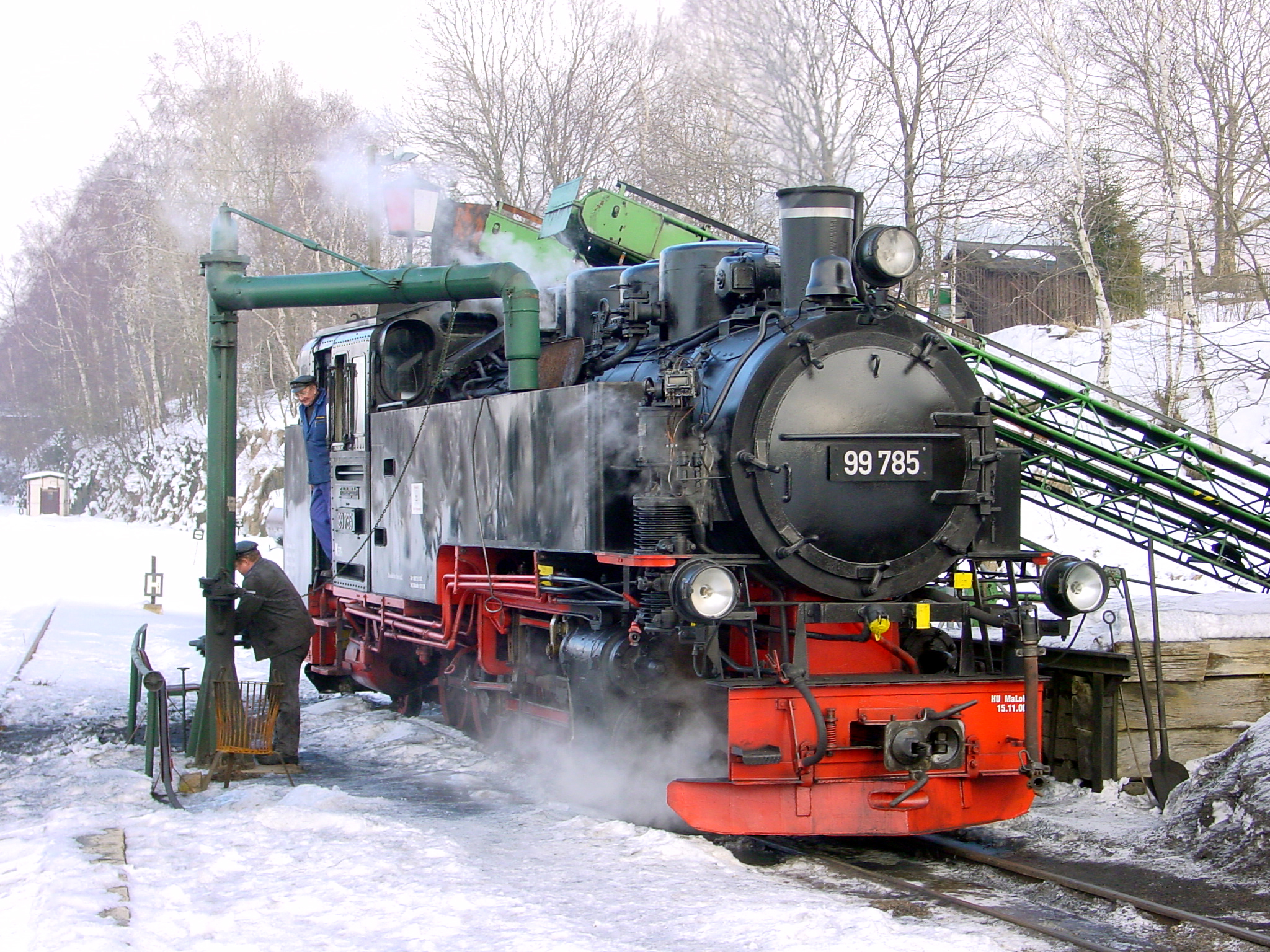
DR Class 99.77-79

=== Railroad cars ===
When the first segment was opened, only relatively short 4-wheel boxcars and passenger cars were used. In 1892 the first passenger cars with bogies were employed, which replaced the 4-wheel cars over the following years. For freight cars this transition did not happen until the early 20th century, when freight cars with bogies for wood and gravel were put into service. The first transporter wagons started service around 1912, and by 1945 completely replaced any of the narrow gauge freight cars.

== Greifenbachtal bridge ==
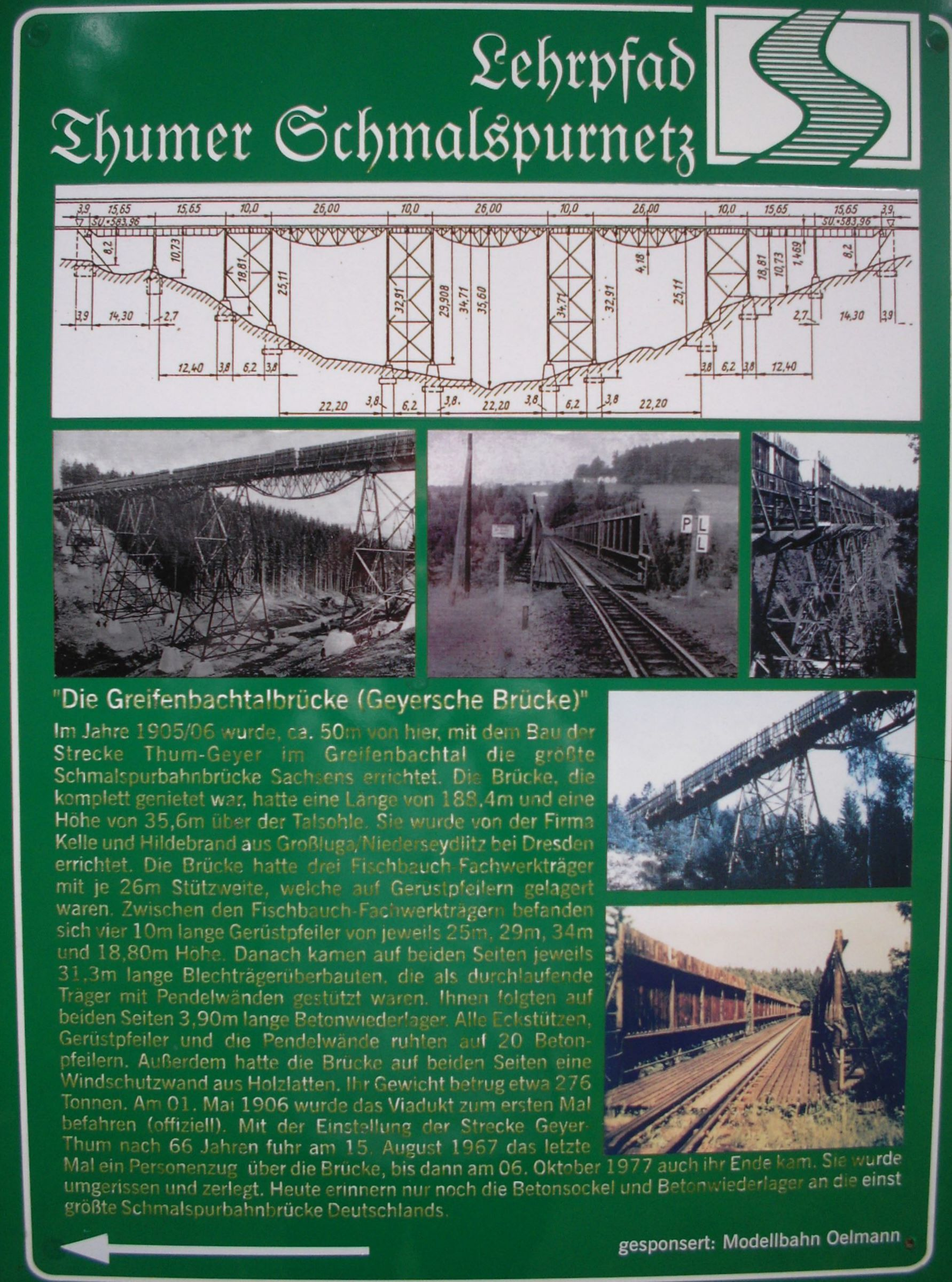
Information panel on the east foundation of the bridge

The Greifenbachtal bridge was a large train bridge on the Schönfeld-Wiesa - Thum segment of the Thumer Netz. It was one of the largest narrow gauge train bridges in Germany and crossed the Greifenbach valley approximately 1.5 km (0.93 mi) north east of Geyer.

The 180.60-metre-long (592.5 ft) bridge was manufactured by Kelle & Hildebrandt in Dresden. Construction took place from 1904 until 1905 at a cost of 130,109 German gold marks. It featured a 6-foot-tall (1.8 m) blast fence, therefore the view from the bridge was rather limited. The bridge was a landmark of the Thumer Netz. After the Schönfeld-Wiesa-Thum railroad was closed on August 15, 1967, the bridge was not used for 10 years, until it was torn down in October 1977. The bridge was cut and pulled down via bulldozer, and cut into smaller pieces on the ground.

Greifenbachtal bridge
Technical data
Mass	275,84 metric tons
length	180,60 m (542 ft)
max. height over ground	35,60 m (106.8 ft)
construction	truss bridge

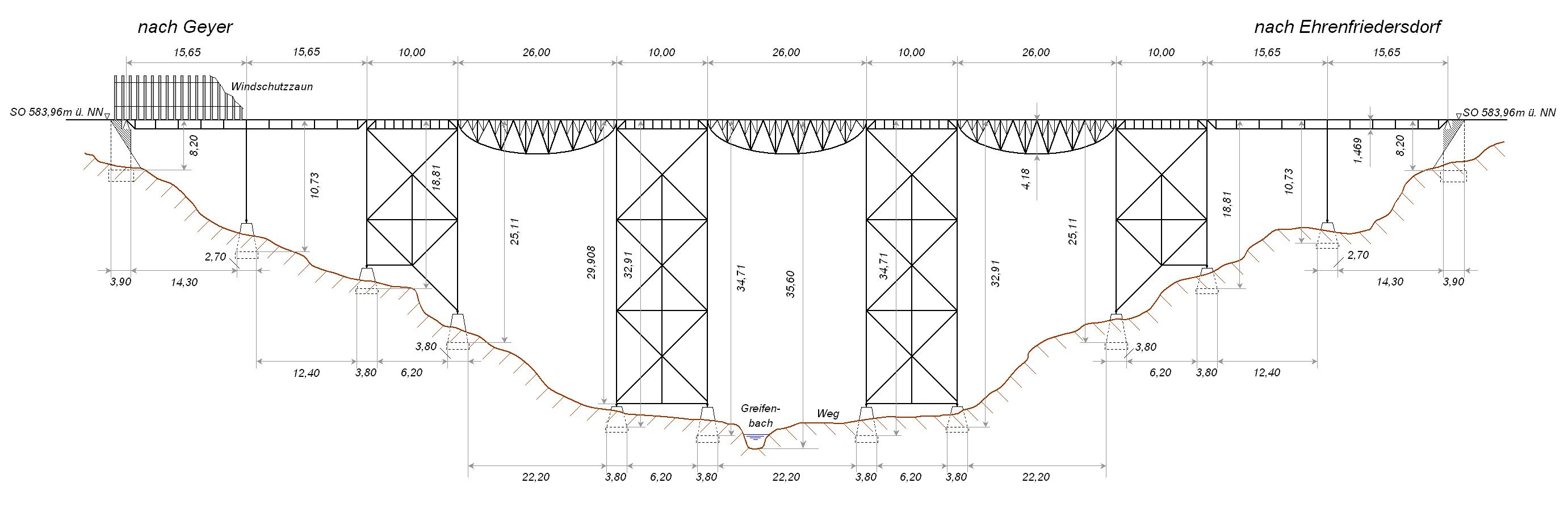
construction drawing

== See also ==
- Narrow gauge railways in Saxony
- Royal Saxon State Railways
