= DR Class 99.77-79 =

DR Class 99.77–79
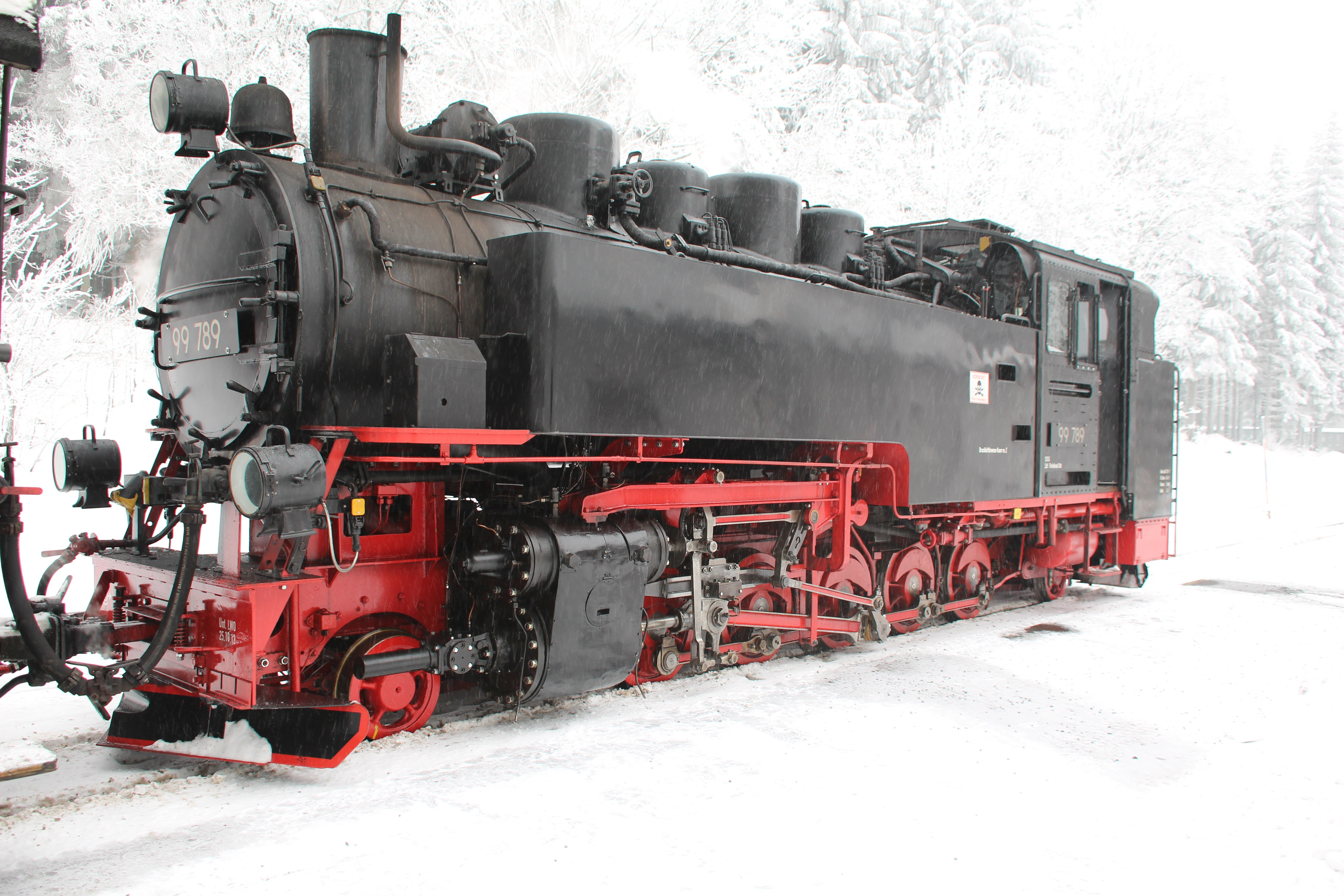
- 99 789 on the Fichtelbergbahn in January 2013
Type and origin
- Power type: Steam
- Builder: VEB Lokomotivbau Karl Marx, Babelsberg
- Build date: 1952–1956
- Total produced: 26
Specifications
- Configuration
  - Whyte: 2-10-2T
  - UIC: 1′E1′ h2t
  - German: K 57.9
- Gauge: 750 mm (2 ft 5 1/2 in)
- Leading dia.: 550 mm (1 ft 9 5/8 in)
- Driver dia.: 800 mm (2 ft 7 1/2 in)
- Trailing dia.: 550 mm (1 ft 9 5/8 in)
- Wheelbase
  - Axle spacing (Asymmetrical): 1,800 mm (5 ft 10 7/8 in) +; 1,000 mm (3 ft 3 3/8 in) +; 1,000 mm (3 ft 3 3/8 in) +; 1,000 mm (3 ft 3 3/8 in) +; 1,000 mm (3 ft 3 3/8 in) +; 1,800 mm (5 ft 10 7/8 in) =
  - Engine: 7,600 mm (24 ft 11 1/4 in)
- Length
  - Over couplers: 11,300 mm (37 ft 7/8 in)
  - Over headstocks: 10,000 mm (32 ft 9 3/4 in)
- Height: 3,550 mm (11 ft 7 3/4 in)
- Axle load: 8.6 t (8.5 long tons; 9.5 short tons)
- Adhesive weight: 42.8 t (42.1 long tons; 47.2 short tons)
- Empty weight: 41.5 t (40.8 long tons; 45.7 short tons)
- Service weight: 55.0 t (54.1 long tons; 60.6 short tons)
- Fuel type: Coal
- Fuel capacity: 3.6 t (3.5 long tons; 4.0 short tons)
- Water cap.: 5.8 m^{3} (1,280 imp gal; 1,530 US gal)
- Firebox
  - Grate area: 2.57 m^{2} (27.7 sq ft)
- Boiler
  - Pitch: 2,100 mm (6 ft 10 5/8 in)
  - Tube plates: 3,200 mm (10 ft 6 in)
  - Small tubes: 44.5 mm (1 3/4 in), 92 off
  - Large tubes: 121 mm (4 3/4 in), 28 off
- Boiler pressure: 14 bar (14.3 kgf/cm^{2}; 203 psi)
- Heating surface
  - Firebox: 8.5 m^{2} (91 sq ft)
  - Tubes: 36.6 m^{2} (394 sq ft)
  - Flues: 31.8 m^{2} (342 sq ft)
  - Total surface: 76.9 m^{2} (828 sq ft)
- Superheater
  - Heating area: 28.8 m^{2} (310 sq ft)
- Cylinders: Two, outside
- Cylinder size: 450 mm × 400 mm (17 11/16 in × 15 3/4 in)
- Valve gear: Heusinger (Walschaerts)
- Train brakes: Hardy vacuum brake, Heberlein brake no longer provided
Performance figures
- Maximum speed: 30 km/h (19 mph)
- Indicated power: 600 PS (441 kW; 592 hp)
- Tractive effort: 83.35 kN (8,500 kp; 18,740 lbf)
Career
- Operators: Deutsche Reichsbahn (GDR)
- Numbers: 99 771 – 99 794 from 1970: 99 1771 – 99 1794
- Retired: from 1976

The steam locomotives of DR Class 99.77–79 were ordered by the Deutsche Reichsbahn in East Germany after the Second World War. They were narrow gauge locomotives with a 750 mm rail gauge and were built for the narrow gauge lines in Saxony. The locomotives were largely identical to the DRG Class 99.73–76 standard locomotives (Einheitslokomotiven) built in the 1930s. To differentiate them from their predecessors they were described as Neubaulokomotiven or newly designed engines.

== History ==
After the Second World War quite a number of the most modern and most powerful narrow gauge locomotives were confiscated by the Soviet occupying powers as war reparations and transported off to the east. That led to a permanent shortage of locomotives on the Saxon narrow gauge lines, not least because the transportation requirement had grown considerably due to the mining of uranium in the Ore Mountains by the firm of Wismut AG. As a result, the VEB Lokomotivbau Karl Marx were tasked with the development of a new locomotive in 1950. This was based heavily on the Einheitslokomotive of DRG Class 99.73–76 designed in the 1930s. From 1952 to 1957 a total of 26 locomotives were delivered. They were given running numbers 99 771 to 99 794 and engines 12 "Patriot" & 13 "Pionier" (these 2 locomotives were built for the Mansfeld Mining Railway at Benndorf). The other 24 engines were homed in the locomotive depots (Bahnbetriebswerken or Bw) of Thum, Meiningen and Wilsdruff.

In the late 1980s the first locomotives had to be withdrawn due to serious damage to the locomotive frame and boiler. Initially it was intended to replace all locomotives by new diesel locomotives from 1995 onwards. However, on the reunification of Germany, all such plans in the GDR were cancelled. As a result, the repair shops (Reichsbahnausbesserungswerk or RAW) responsible, RAW Meiningen and RAW Görlitz-Schlauroth, built new frames and boilers for 14 locomotives in 1991/1992 in order to keep the engines in working order.

Today the engines continue to work a lot of the traffic on their original routes. Additionally some of these locomotives may also be found today on the island of Rügen in the Baltic Sea working the Rügen railway (Rügenschen Kleinbahnen), where some of them where already stationed in GDR times. One locomotive, no. 99 788, was sold to the museum railway from Warthausen to Ochsenhausen in Baden-Württemberg, the so-called Öchsle, and operates there.

== Technical features ==
In accordance with modern construction principles of the time, the locomotives are of a fully welded design.

In contrast to their predecessors the machines were given a plate frame. Like them, however, the third axle is driven and the carrying axles are housed in a Bissel bogie. Two vacuum injectors form the feed water system. In order to enable brown coal firing, the grate area was increased compared with that of the Einheitslok.

The vehicles can carry up to 5.8 m^{3} of water and 3.6 tonnes of coal.

== Operations ==
The first area of operations were the Thumer Netz network with the Schönfeld-Wiesa–Thum–Meinersdorf and Wilischthal–Thum lines, the Cranzahl– Oberwiesenthal spa town route (Fichtelberg Railway) and the Freital-Hainsberg–Kipsdorf spa town line (Weisseritz Valley Railway). Several locomotives were also stationed in Thuringia on the Trusebahn.

After the closure of the Thum network in the early 1970s the locomotives were transferred to the Lößnitzgrund Railway (Radebeul Ost–Radeburg). Not until the 1980s did some locomotives end up on the Rügenschen Schmalspurbahn and Zittau network, in order to alleviate the shortage of engines there.

== Gallery ==
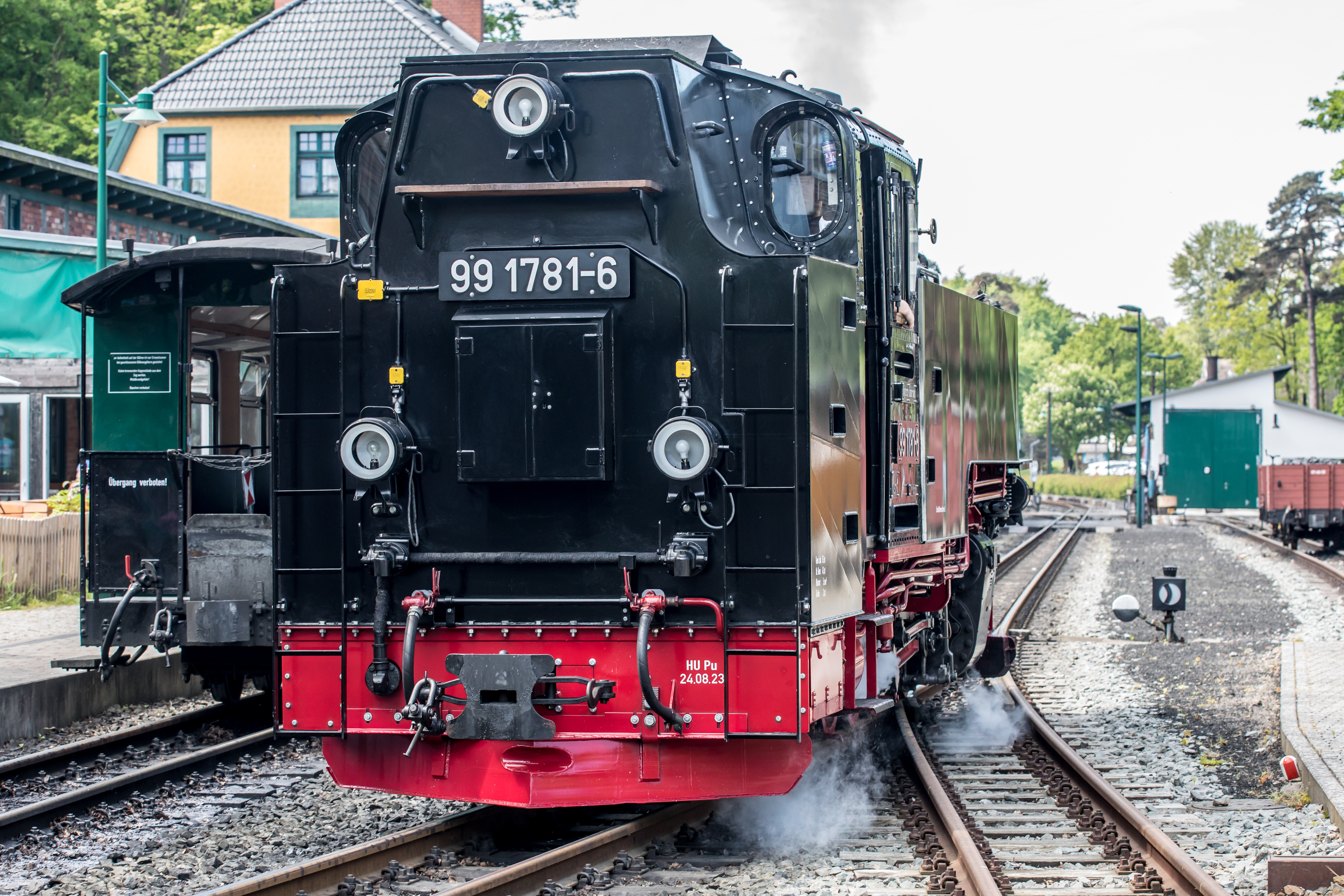
99 781 in regular service with RüKB

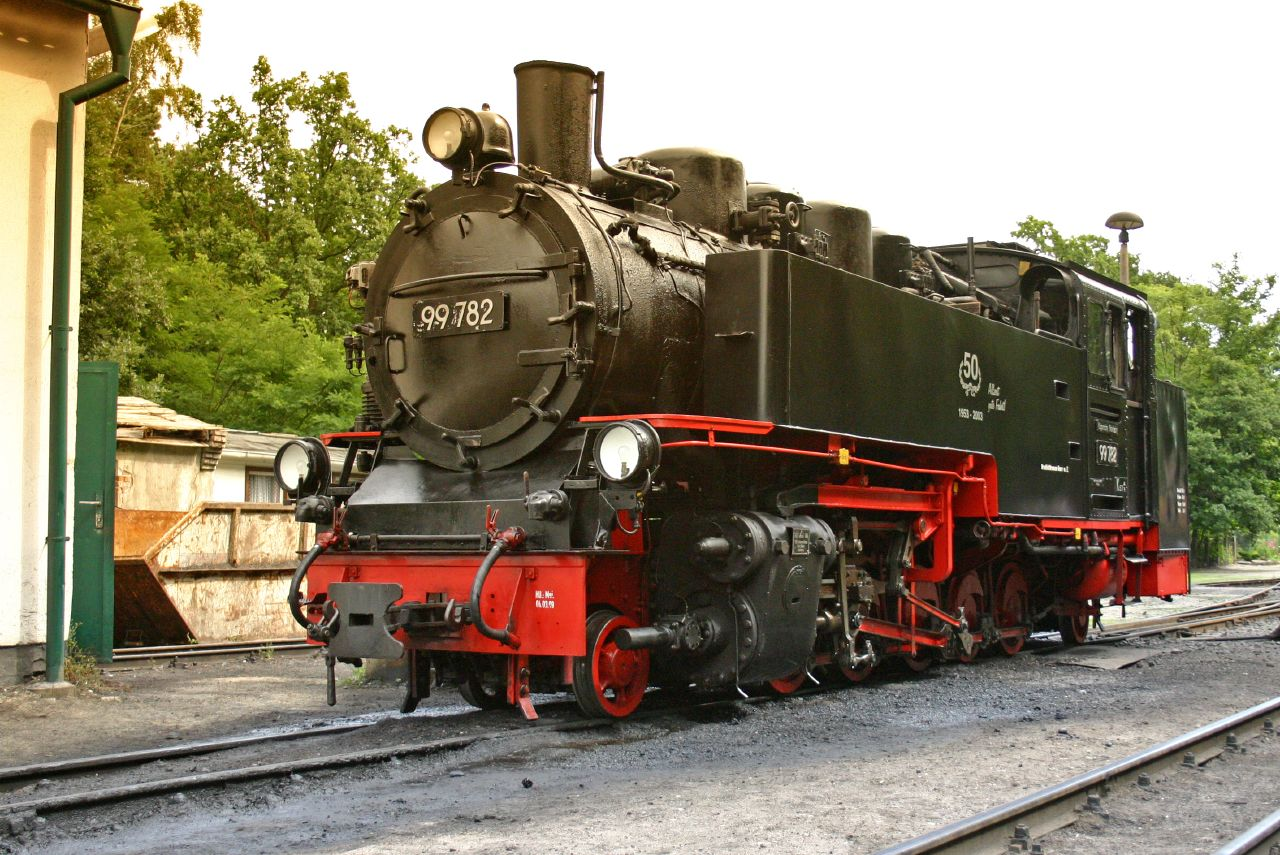
99 782 of the Rügen island railway (RüKB)

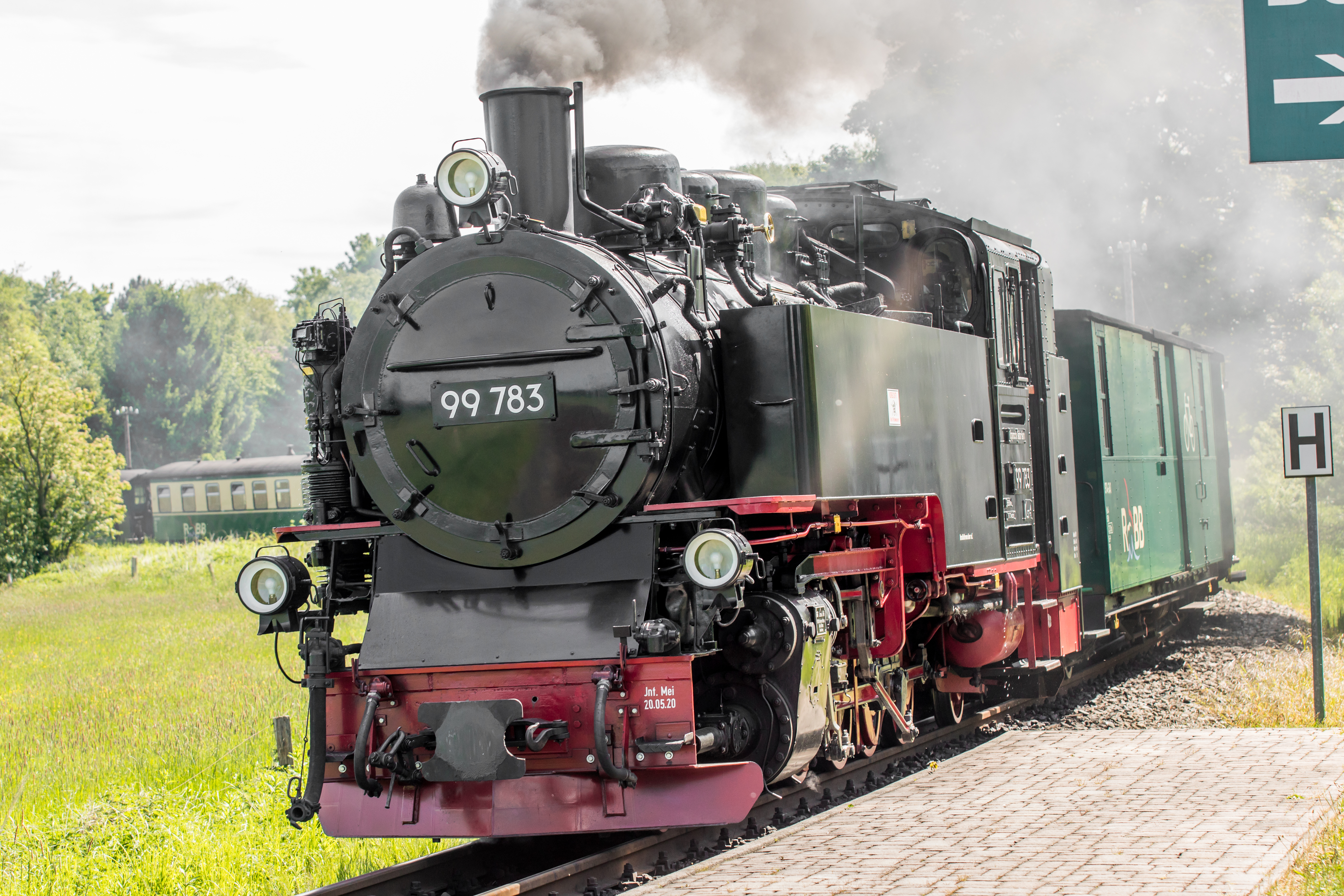
99 783 in regular service with RüKB

"Rasender Roland" in Sellin Ost

== See also ==
- List of East German Deutsche Reichsbahn locomotives and railbuses
- Neubaulok
