= Geyer =

- Town
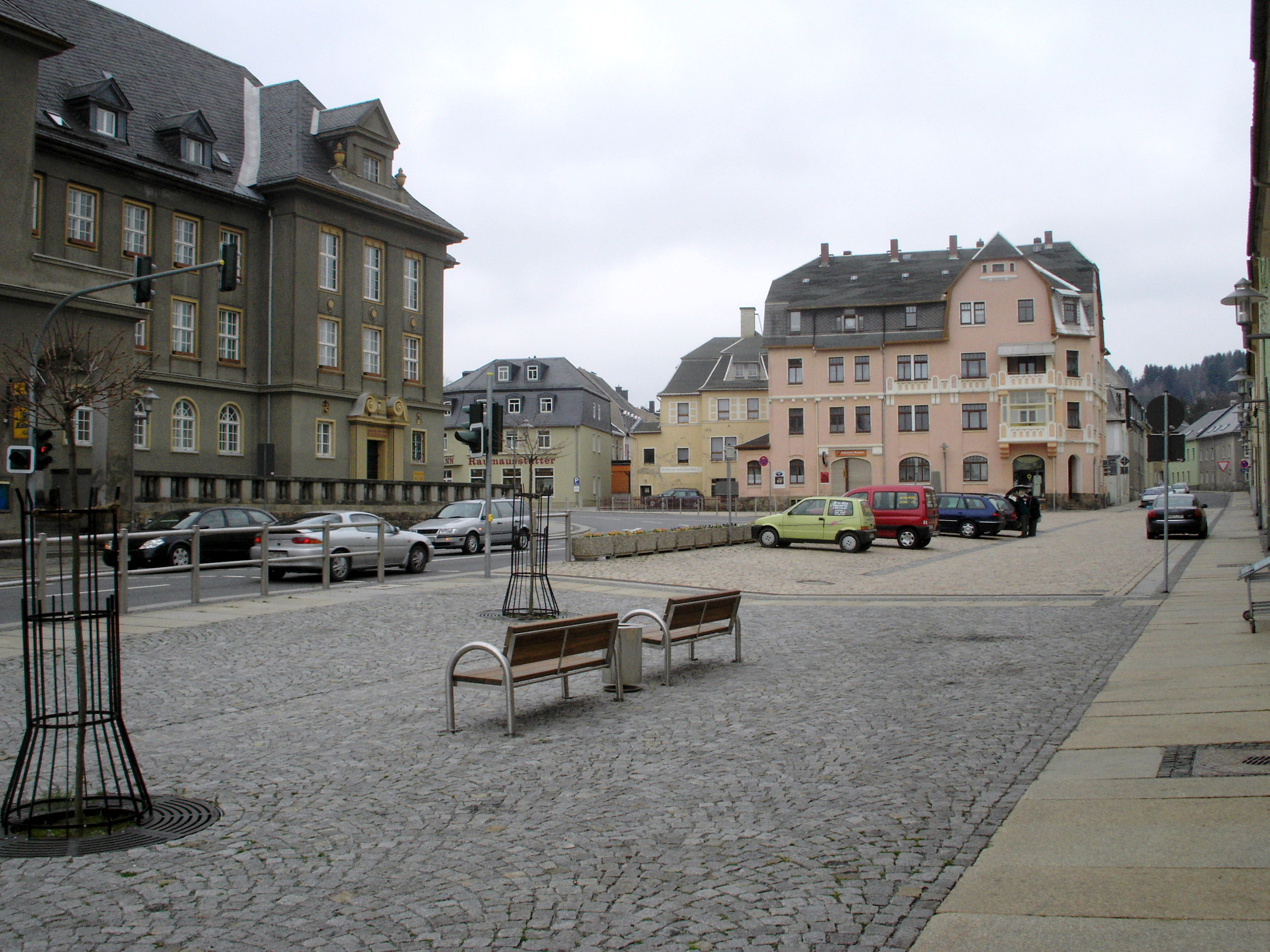

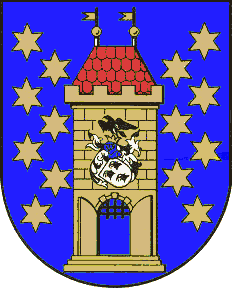
- Coat of arms

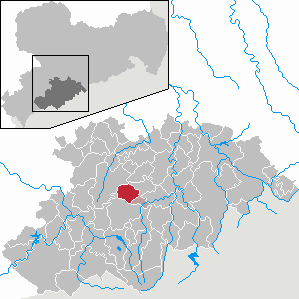
- Location of Geyer within Erzgebirgskreis district
- Interactive map of Geyer
- Location within Germany Location within Saxony
- Coordinates: 50°37′25″N 12°55′24″E
- Country: Germany
- State: Saxony
- District: Erzgebirgskreis

Government
  - Mayor (2018–25): Harald Wendler (Left)

Area
  - Total: 18.56 km^{2} (7.17 sq mi)
- Elevation: 550–741 m (1,804–2,431 ft)

Population (2025-12-31)
  - Total: 3,239
  - Density: 174.5/km^{2} (452.0/sq mi)
- Time zone: UTC+01:00 (CET)
  - Summer (DST): UTC+02:00 (CEST)
- Postal codes: 09468
- Dialling codes: 037346
- Vehicle registration: ERZ, ANA, ASZ, AU, MAB, MEK, STL, SZB, ZP
- Website: www.stadt-geyer.de

Geyer (German pronunciation: [ˈɡaɪɐ]) is a town in the district of Erzgebirgskreis, in Saxony, Germany. It has a population of about 4,000.

== Geography ==
Geyer is situated 8 km (4.97 mi) northwest of Annaberg-Buchholz, and 23 km (14.29 mi) south of Chemnitz, in the valley of the Geyersbach creek. The town is largely surrounded by forest, with the Geyersche Wald forest to the west being owned by the town.

Geyer borders to Ehrenfriedersdorf in the north east, Tannenberg in the south east, Elterlein in the south. The town of Zwönitz is in the west, Hormersdorf to the north west and the Greifensteine area to the north.

== History ==
Geyer was first mentioned in official documents in 1381, although mining in the Ore Mountains had already existed a few decades before. In 1407 Geyer was granted town privileges (Marktrecht), and 60 years later it already became a town. In 1537 the town was introduced to the Protestant Reformation. Famous Renaissance builder Hieronymus Lotter settled in Geyer in 1566.

In the 16th century mining became harder to sustain, since most of the mines started to become depleted, which produced more and more waste rock. This resulted in larger and larger cavities, which led in 1704 and in 1803 to large cave-ins in Geyer. The resulting Geyersche Binge cave-in can still be visited today.

With the decline in ore-mining in the area, Geyer (as in many other towns and villages in the Ore Mountains) turned to wooden toy manufacture - such as Schwibbogen, nutcrackers and Christmas pyramids – as well as bobbin lace as a matter of economic survival. In the 18th and 19th centuries, the textile industry was the main source of income for Geyer. In 1888, Geyer was connected to a narrow gauge railway that was to become part of the Thumer Netz, and in 1897, the town was connected to the electrical grid.

From 1952 to 1990, Geyer was part of the Bezirk Karl-Marx-Stadt of East Germany.

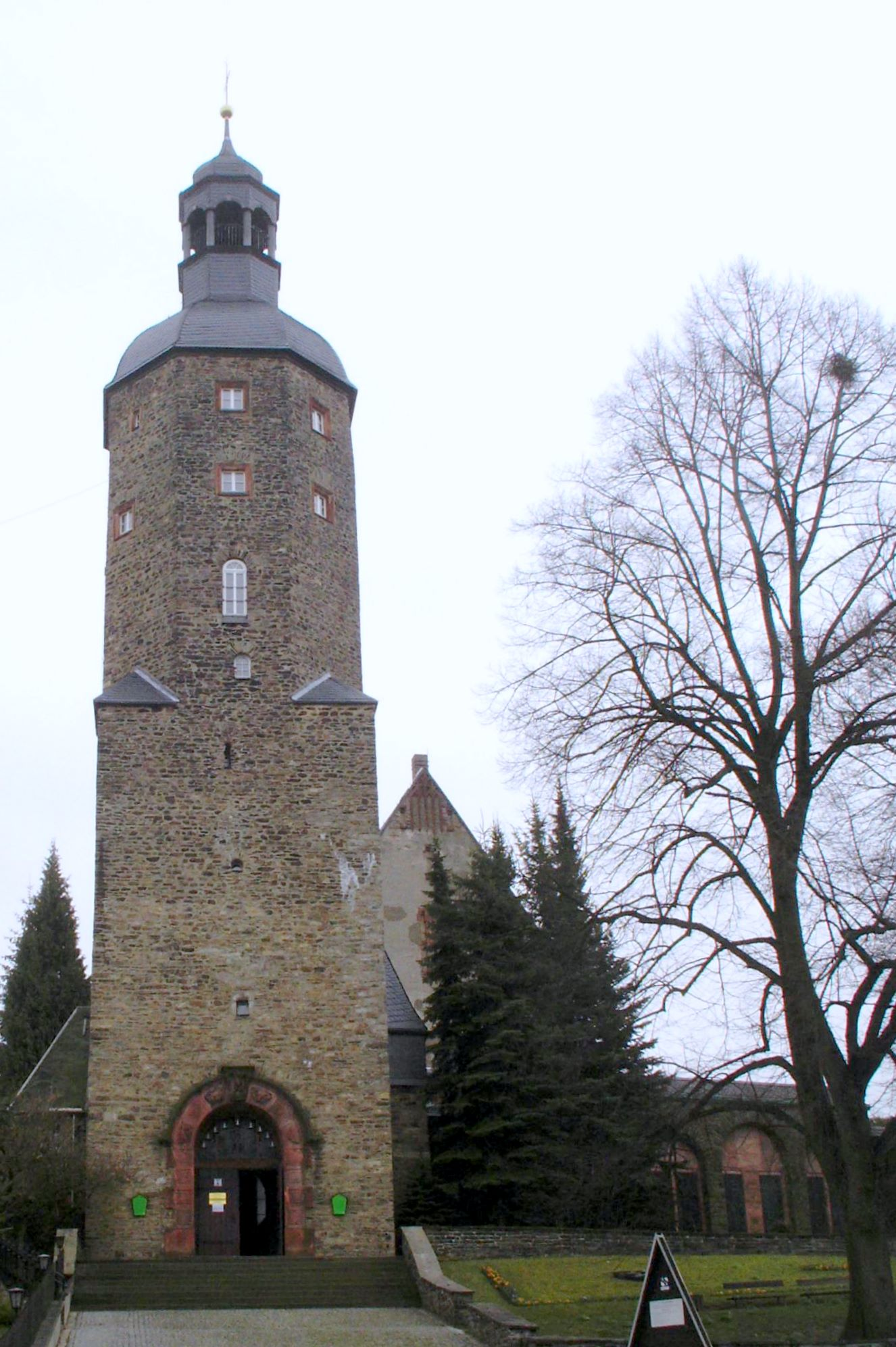
Watch tower

== Sights ==
=== Tower museum ===
The 42 m (137.8 ft) high watch tower was built in 1395 as a wall tower, serving as refuge for citizens in times of war. Between 1561 and 1564 the tower was raised with the characteristic octagonal shape. This was done to create room for the Türmerfamilie, a fire guard (and his family), in order to provide warning from the devastating and frequent conflagrations in those days. In 1952 this tower was converted into a museum, which shows on seven levels historic items related to mining and the town's life through the centuries.

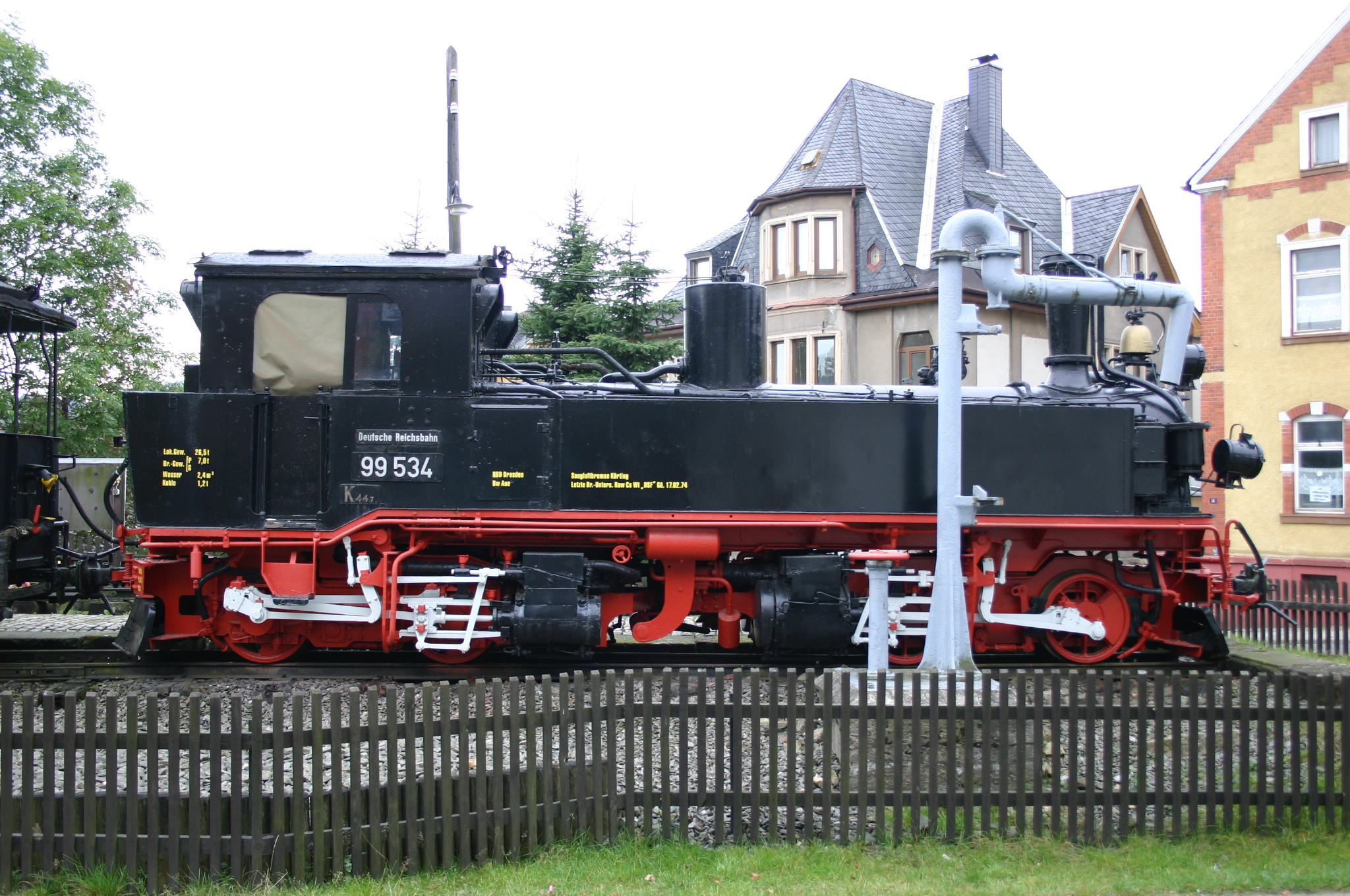
Saxon IV K 99 534 at the former railroad station in Geyer

=== Old railway station ===
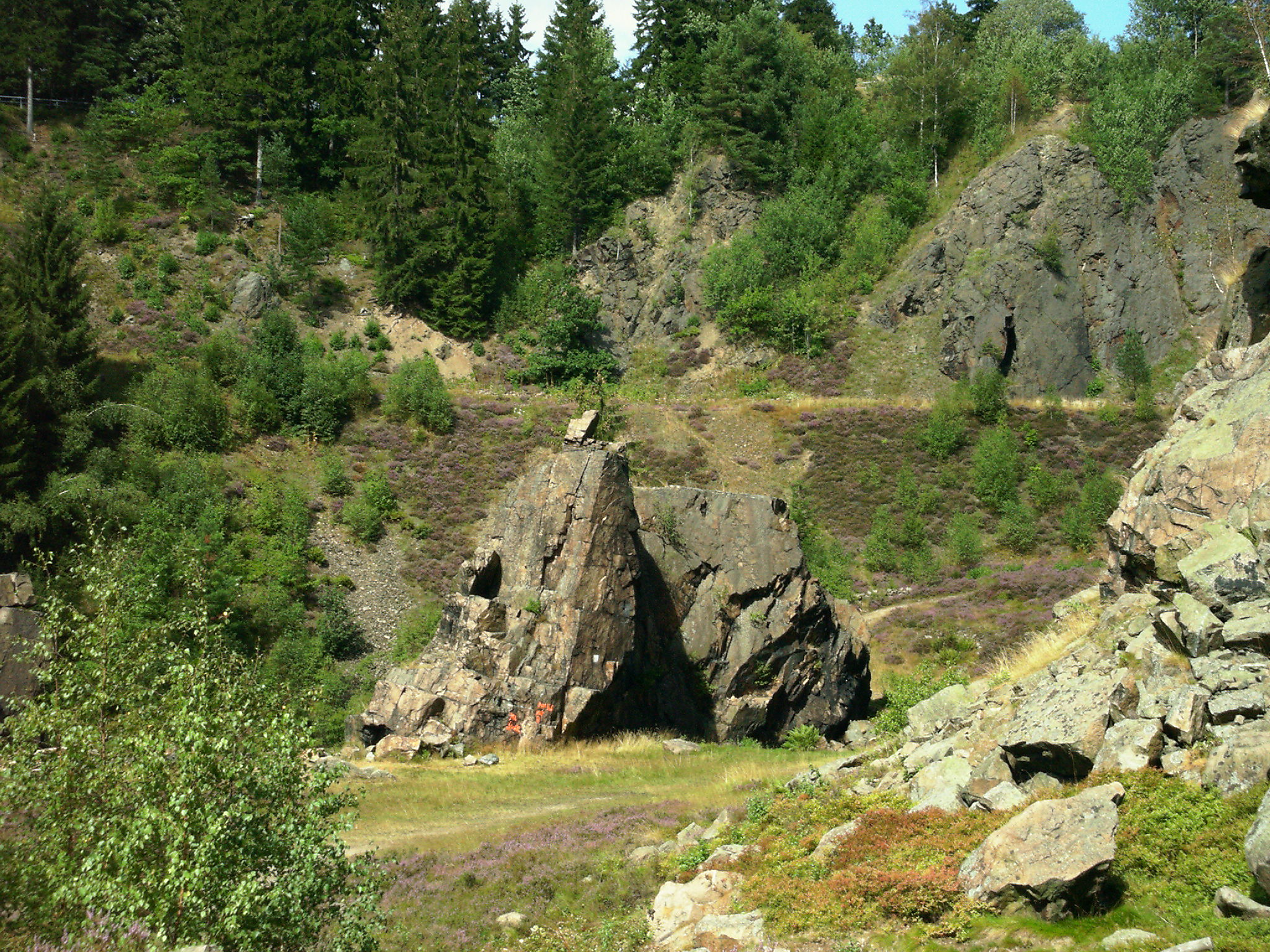
Geyersche Binge

At the former station site, there is a historic Saxon IV K narrow gauge steam locomotive together with railroad cars on display, a reminder of the time when Geyer was part of the Thumer Netz within the narrow gauge railways in Saxony.

=== Geyersche Binge ===
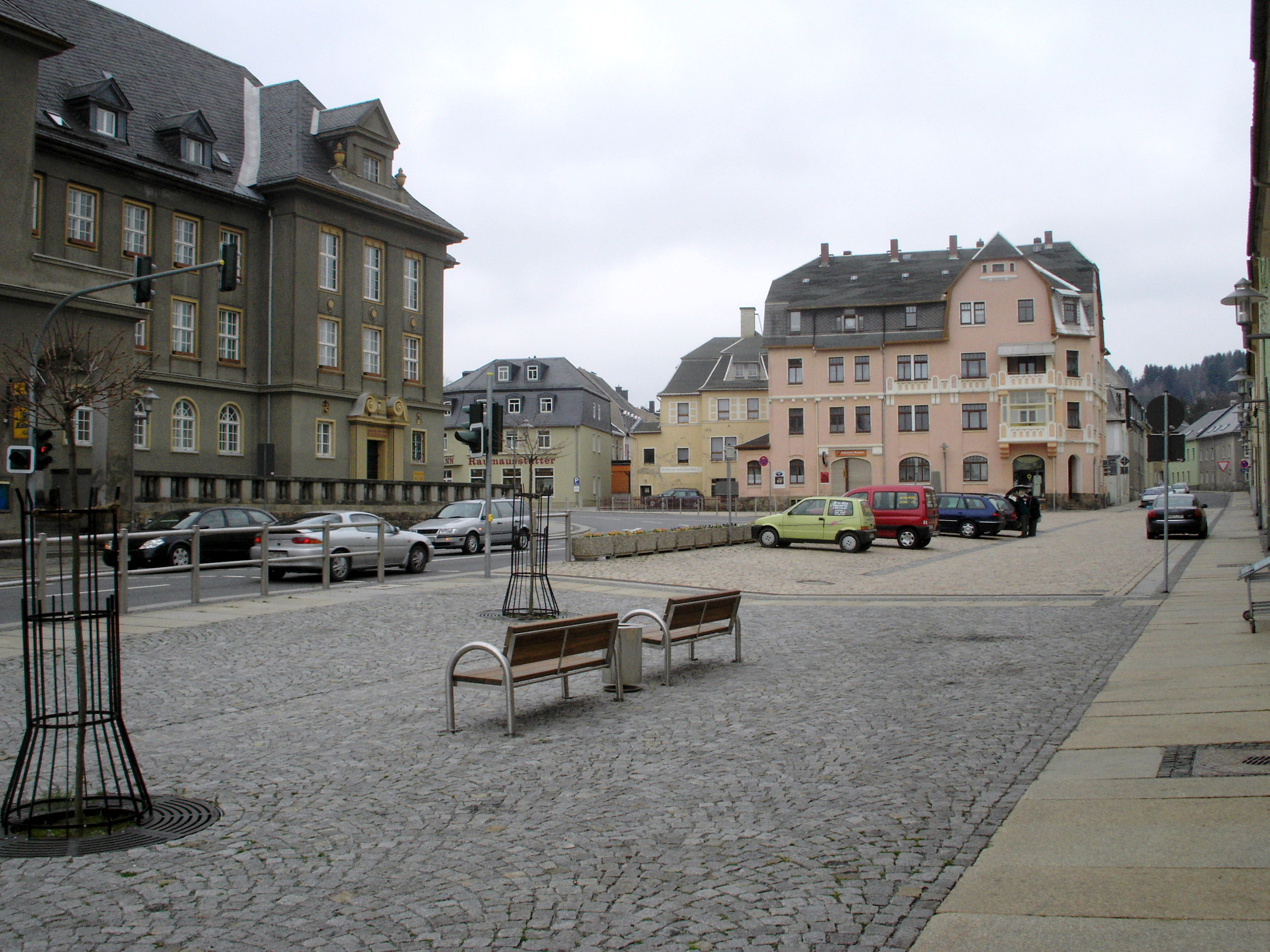
Geyer

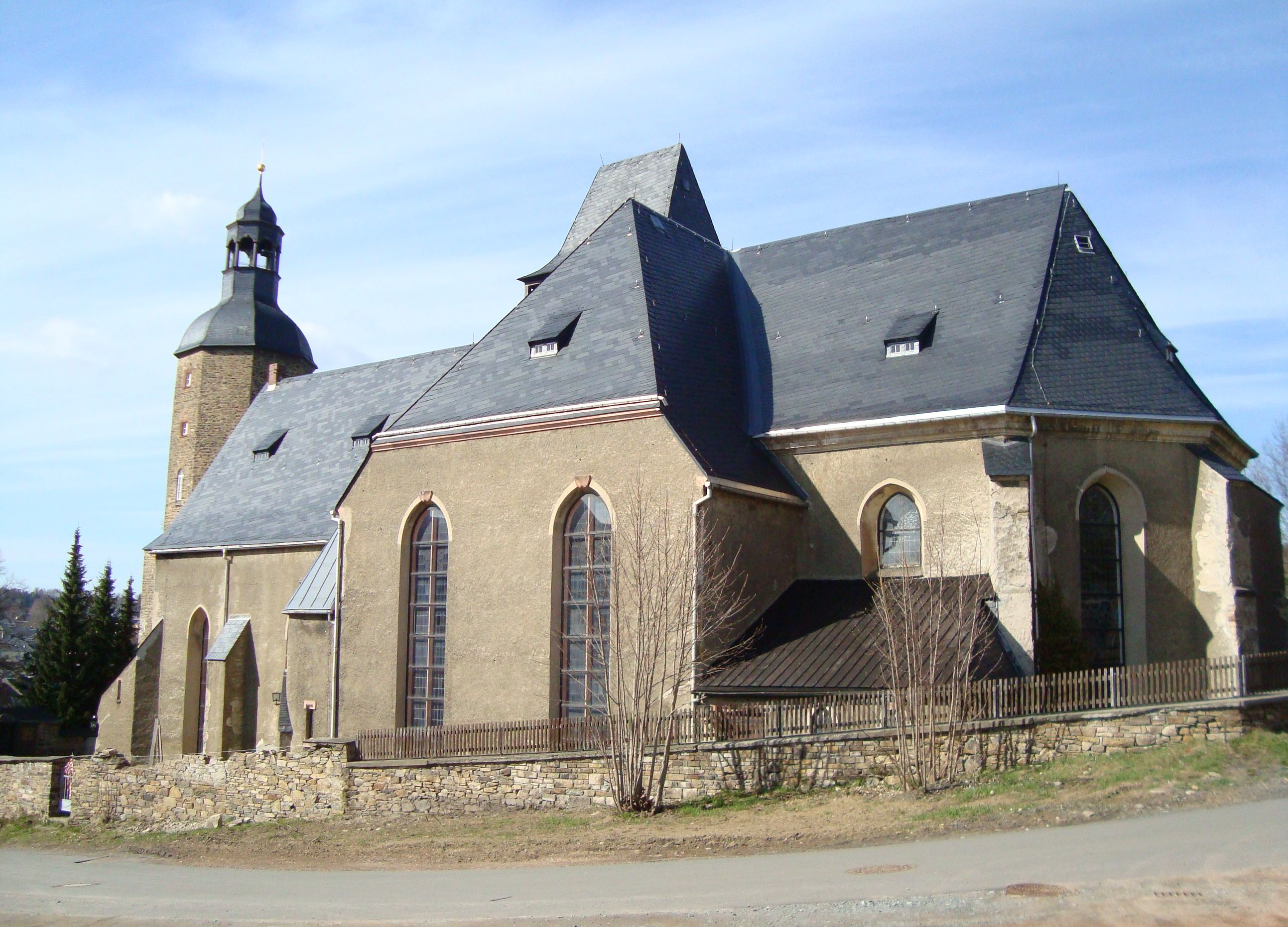
Laurentius church Geyer

The Geyersche Binge is a collapsed ore mine caused by fire-setting (a Binge is a mining sink-hole). The first cave-in was caused in 1704, and was followed by several others over the years. The last collapse was on 11 May 1803 and led to the cessation of mining in Geyer. The area of the Binge is about 60 m (197 ft) deep, 200 m (656 ft) wide and 250 m (820 ft) long. In 1935 it became a nature reserve.

== Notable people ==
- Kuno Klötzer (1922–2011), football player and coach
- Adam Ries (1492–1559), mathematician, worked as a tithe collector (Zehentner) from 1533 to 1539 in Geyer
- Hieronymus Lotter (c. 1497–1580), merchant and mayor of Leipzig; died here
- Adam Friedrich Zürner (1679–1742), cartographer and geographer

=== Personalities who have worked on the ground ===
- Eric Frenzel (born 1988), Nordic combiner
