= Thum =

- Town
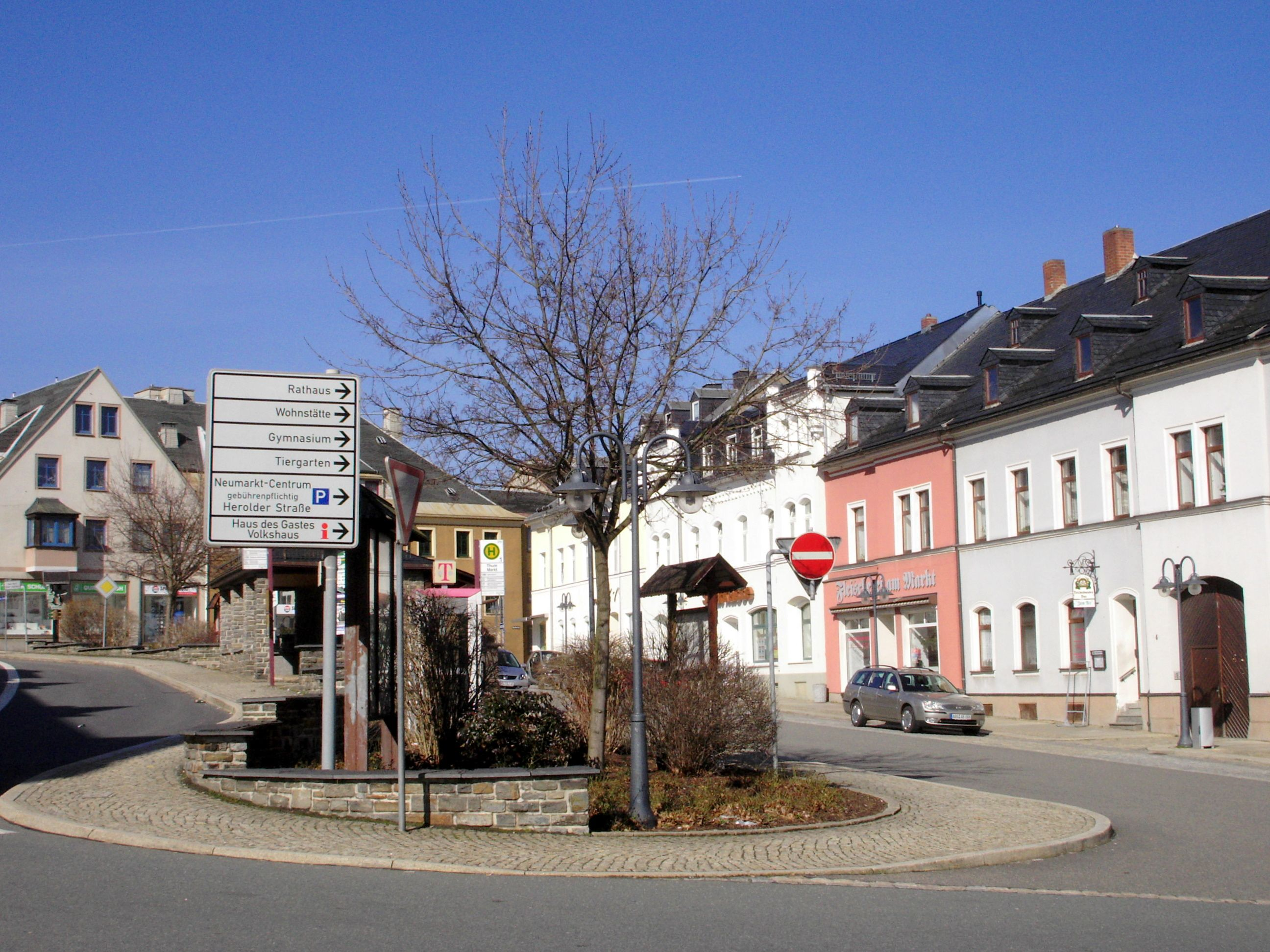

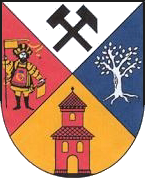
- Coat of arms

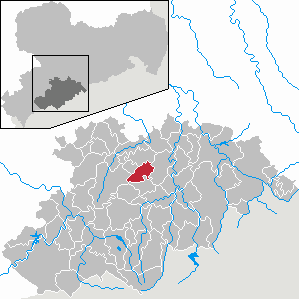
- Location of Thum within Erzgebirgskreis district
- Interactive map of Thum
- Location within Germany Location within Saxony
- Coordinates: 50°40′16″N 12°57′5″E
- Country: Germany
- State: Saxony
- District: Erzgebirgskreis
- Subdivisions: 3

Government
  - Mayor (2020–27): Thomas Mauersberger

Area
  - Total: 18.89 km^{2} (7.29 sq mi)
- Elevation: 550–630 m (1,800–2,070 ft)

Population (2025-12-31)
  - Total: 4,655
  - Density: 246.4/km^{2} (638.2/sq mi)
- Time zone: UTC+01:00 (CET)
  - Summer (DST): UTC+02:00 (CEST)
- Postal codes: 09419
- Dialling codes: 037297
- Vehicle registration: ERZ, ANA, ASZ, AU, MAB, MEK, STL, SZB, ZP
- Website: www.stadt-thum.de

Thum (German pronunciation: [tuːm]) is a small town in the district of Erzgebirgskreis in Saxony, Germany. It has a population of about 5,000.

== Geography ==
Thum is situated in the Ore Mountains, 10 km northwest of Annaberg-Buchholz, and 19 km south of Chemnitz. The Jahnsbach, a tributary to the Zschopau River runs through the town. To the north is Gelenau, east is Drebach, south of Thum is the town of Ehrenfriedersdorf. The Greifensteine area lies to the south west, and Hormersdorf and Auerbach are to the west.

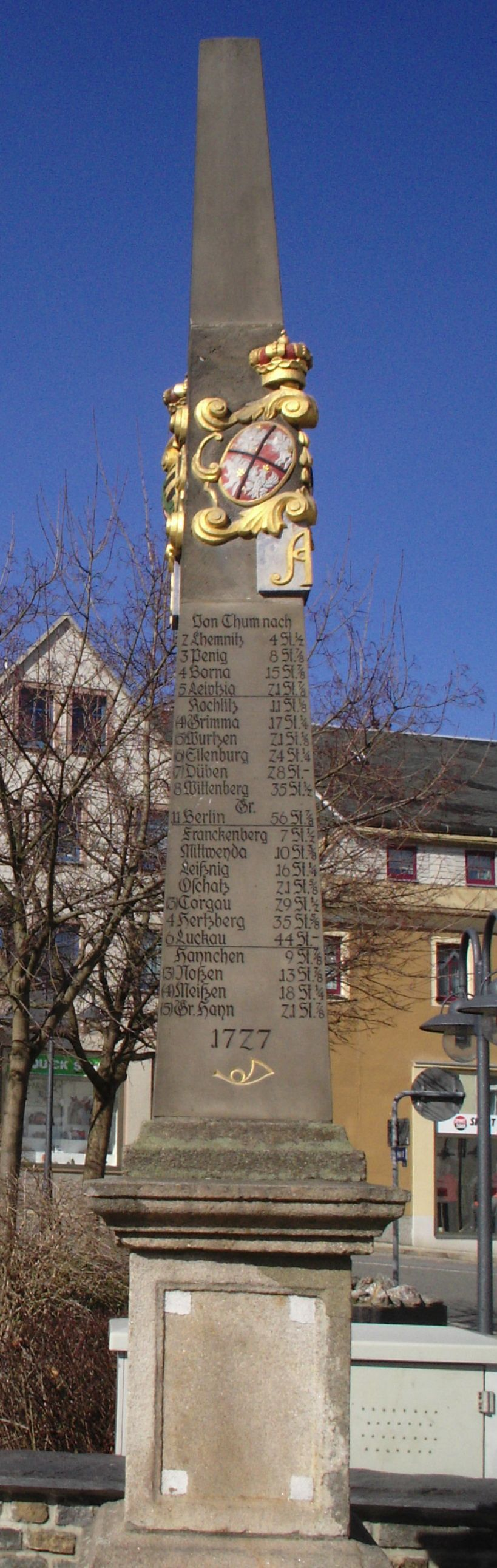
Historic Saxon milepost in Thum

== History ==
Thum was first mentioned 1389 in historic records of the archdiocese of Prague. From the 14th century, mining in the once densely forested Ore Mountains steadily increased, and a history book of 1445 describes Thum as a small mining town. Several placer deposits, two stamp mills and 27 mines were in the area of Thum. Considerable amounts of Axinite were found, which initially was given the name Thumit. In 1469 the citizens of Thum acquired township.

The last battle of the Thirty Years' War in Saxony was fought on January 15, 1648, near Thum. The destruction caused by the war resulted in mining no longer being sustainable. With the run-down of ore-mining in the area, Thum (like many other towns and villages in the Ore Mountains) turned to wooden toy manufacture – such as Schwibbogen and Christmas pyramids – as well as bobbin lace as a matter of economic survival. In the 18th and 19th centuries, the textile industry was the main source of income for Thum.

In 1886, a narrow gauge railway connected Thum to Wilischthal. This Thumer Netz was part of the narrow gauge railways in Saxony and was expanded throughout the early 20th century.

The Rittergut (manor) of Dorfthum was incorporated into Thum in 1879. With the zoning reforms in the 1990s, the neighbouring Reihendorf villages of Jahnsbach and Herold were incorporated into Thum.

=== Historical brewery ("Dampfbrauerei") ===
The original brewery, founded in the 14th century, was the property of the church until 1546 when it was acquired by the town, and a brewing cooperative was formed. This cooperative dissolved in 1882, and brewer William Böttger bought the buildings and inventory. He built new brewery buildings in 1898 and increased production to 15,000 hecto litres. After the death of Böttger, in 1926 his widow sold the brewery back to the town of Thum, which was unable to find a buyer. This ended the long brewing tradition in Thum. In 2000, the brand was revived under the name of Thumer Lager. It is now being brewed using the original recipe by a brewery in Chemnitz.

== Coat of arms ==
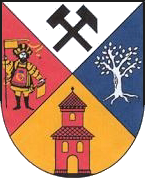
The town council approved the current coat of arms after the incorporation of Jahnsbach and Herold.

The coat of arms displays:

- Top: the hammer and pick symbolize the mining tradition of the area
- Left: the herald in the left quadrant stands for Herold
- Bottom: the tower stands for Thum
- Right: the tree stands for Jahnsbach and symbolizes a Gerichtslinde

== Notable persons ==
- Tobias Clausnitzer (February 5, 1619 in Thum – May 7, 1684 in Weiden in der Oberpfalz)
- Bernhard Hofmann (22 November 1896 in Thum – 19 November 1982 in Crailsheim), German military officer and general in the Sturmabteilung (SA)
- Edgar Barth (January 26, 1917 Herold (Thum)– May 20, 1965, Ludwigsburg), Formula One and sports car racing driver.
- Jürgen Barth (born December 10, 1947, in Thum), a German engineer, sports car racer and 24 Hours of Le Mans winner. The son of Edgar Barth.
