= Greifensteine =

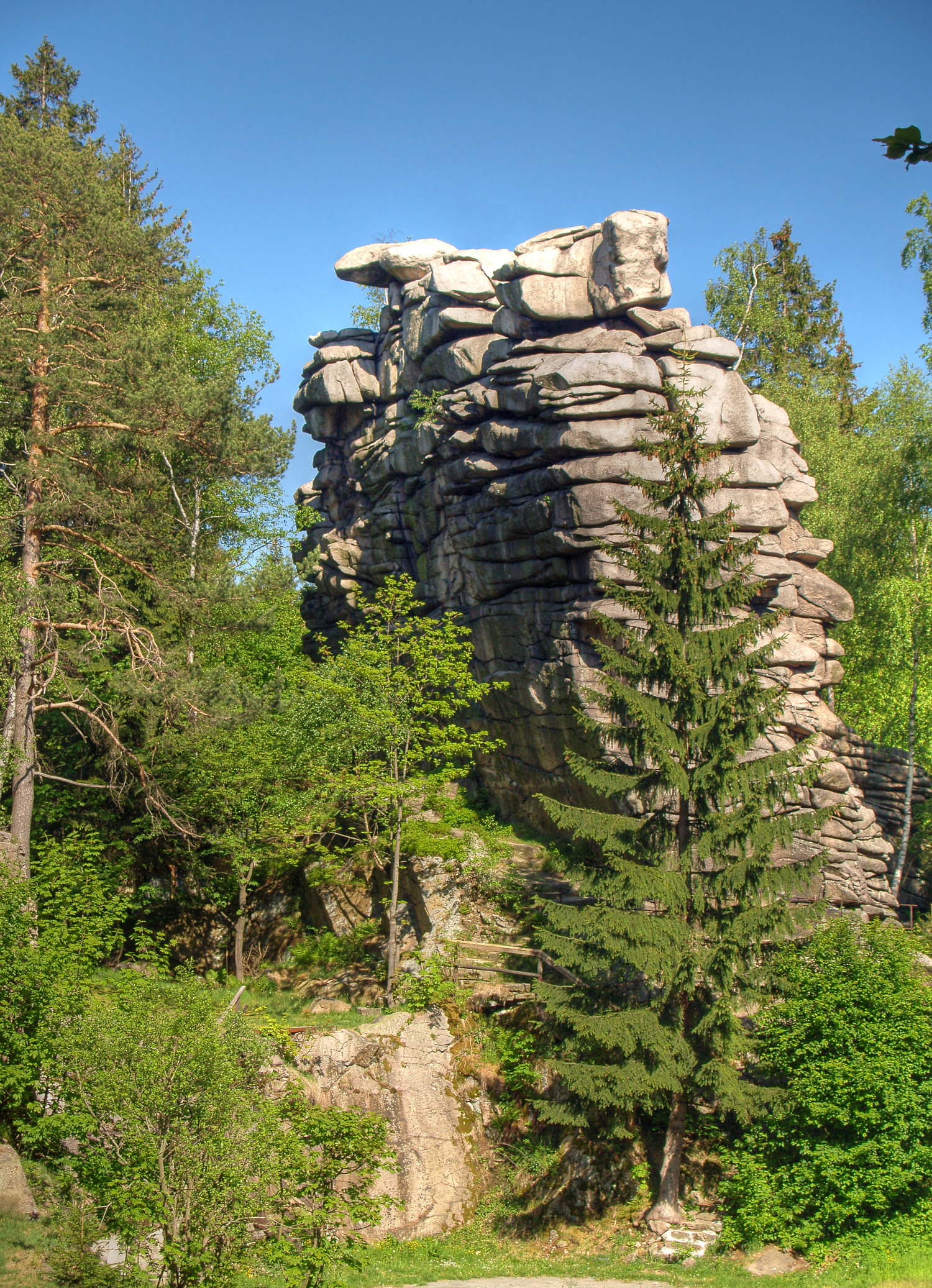
- The Greifensteine rock tower

Highest point
- Elevation: 2,193 ft (668 m)
- Coordinates: 50°38′56″N 12°55′49″E

Geography
- Location: Ehrenfriedersdorf, Saxony, Germany
- Parent range: Ore Mountains

Geology
- Rock age: Tertiary
- Mountain type: Granite

The Greifensteine is a rock tower in the Ore Mountains, Germany, between the towns of Geyer, Ehrenfriedersdorf and Jahnsbach. The highest of the seven granite rocks reaches 731 m. Another six rock towers were demolished by quarrying, which ended in 1923.

== Geology ==
Geologically, the Greifensteine is the top of a pluton. During the Variscan orogeny, magma intruded along structural zones, but cooled and solidified before reaching the Earth surface. When the Erzgebirge block raised, the resulting granite formation raised with it. The surrounding softer material eroded and the harder granite remained, creating the tors of the rock formation. The deposition of ores associated with the intrusion gave the area its name (Ore Mountains).

=== Mineral finds ===
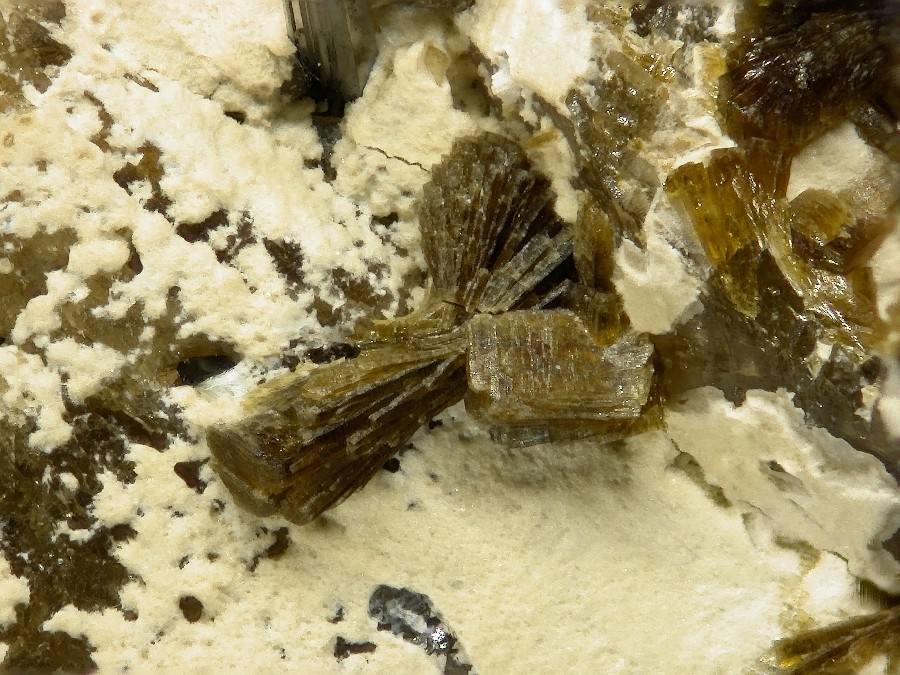
Greifensteinite from the type locality of Greifenstein (image width: 3 mm)

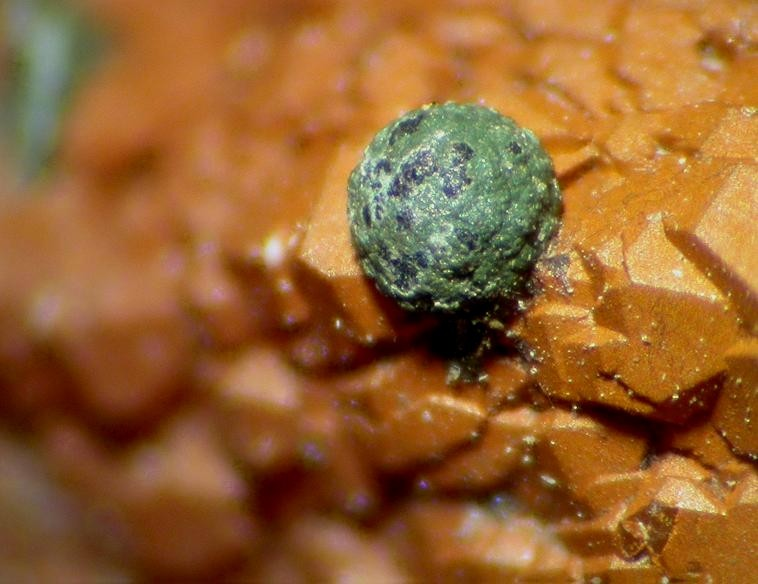
Natrodufrénite from Greifenstein (image width: 3 mm)

Due to the productiveness of its ore deposits, the Greifensteine are also a well-known site of many different minerals and their varieties. As of 2014, a total of around 50 minerals and 10 varieties have been discovered here, including inter alia the well-known minerals andalusite, beryl, gypsum, haematite, muscovite, sphalerite, pyrite, topaz, wavellite and zircon, as well as various garnets, tourmalines, (dravite, elbaite, schorl) and wolframites. There are also rare minerals such as childrenite and natrodufrénite, as well as the radioactive minerals autunite and torbernite.

The Greifensteine is also a type locality for the following minerals: fluorapatite, greifensteinite, lacroixite and roscherite.

== History ==
The first indications of a settlement on the Greifensteine are from around 1180, and in 1349 the von Waldenburg family are seignory to the "Grifenstein" castle. The castle is documented in 1372 as "Slosz Cryfenstein". The castle was destroyed in the 14th century by fire, and was rebuilt afterwards. It was abandoned in the 15th century, the area was used as a quarry and all traces of the former castle are removed. Of the originally 13 rock towers, six have been demolished and used for their granite over the years. This activity was stopped in 1928, and the area has become a nature reserve.

== Tourism ==
Today, the Greifensteine is a nature reserve and a popular tourist attraction. The areal has a restaurant, a small museum and an outdoor theater that uses the rock towers as a dramatic backdrop. Stairs lead up to the tallest rock, which offers a nice view of the surrounding Ore Mountains. There are several rock climbing paths. In the surrounding area are the Greifenbachstauweiher and the Röhrgraben.

=== Stülpner-Höhle ===
Karl Stülpner (1762–1842), a local renegade and folk hero (the Robin Hood of the Ore Mountains) had a hiding place in one of the numerous caverns of the Greifensteine area. This Stülpner-Höhle (engl.: Stülpner's cavern) can still be visited today.
