= DRG Class 99.73–76 =

DRG Class 99.73-76
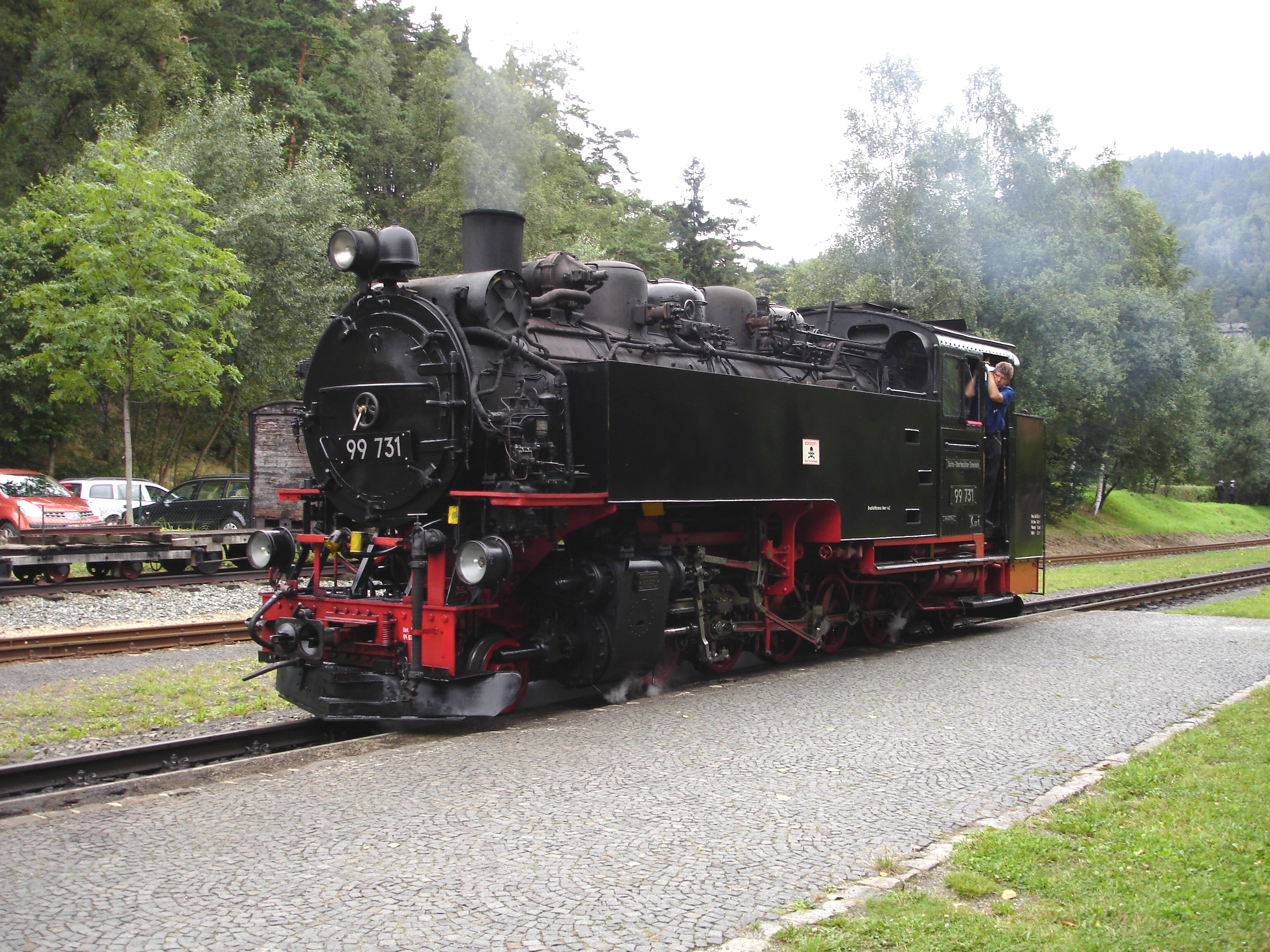
- 99 731 in August 2007
Type and origin
- Power type: Steam
- Builder: Sächsische Maschinenfabrik (13); Berliner Maschinenbau (19)
- Build date: 1928–1929, 1933
- Total produced: 32
Specifications
- Configuration
  - Whyte: 2-10-2T
  - UIC: 1′E1′ h2t
  - German: K 57.9
- Gauge: 750 mm (2 ft 5 1/2 in)
- Leading dia.: 550 mm (1 ft 9 5/8 in)
- Driver dia.: 800 mm (2 ft 7 1/2 in)
- Trailing dia.: 550 mm (1 ft 9 5/8 in)
- Wheelbase
  - Axle spacing (Asymmetrical): 1,800 mm (5 ft 10 7/8 in) +; 1,000 mm (3 ft 3 3/8 in) +; 1,000 mm (3 ft 3 3/8 in) +; 1,000 mm (3 ft 3 3/8 in) +; 1,000 mm (3 ft 3 3/8 in) +; 1,800 mm (5 ft 10 7/8 in) =
  - Engine: 7,600 mm (24 ft 11 1/4 in)
- Length
  - Over couplers: 10,540 mm (34 ft 7 in)
- Height: 3,570 mm (11 ft 8 9/16 in)
- Axle load: 9.2 t (9.1 long tons; 10.1 short tons)
- Adhesive weight: 46.1 t (45.4 long tons; 50.8 short tons)
- Empty weight: 44.3 t (43.6 long tons; 48.8 short tons)
- Service weight: 56.7 t (55.8 long tons; 62.5 short tons)
- Fuel type: Coal
- Fuel capacity: 2.5 t (2.5 long tons; 2.8 short tons)
- Water cap.: 5.8 m^{3} (1,280 imp gal; 1,530 US gal)
- Firebox
  - Grate area: 1.74 m^{2} (18.7 sq ft)
- Boiler
  - Pitch: 2,100 mm (6 ft 10 5/8 in)
  - Tube plates: 3,500 mm (137 3/4 in)
  - Small tubes: 44.5 mm (1 3/4 in), 92 off
  - Large tubes: 118 mm (4 5/8 in), 28 off
- Boiler pressure: 14 kgf/cm^{2} (13.7 bar; 199 psi)
- Heating surface
  - Firebox: 6.9 m^{2} (74 sq ft)
  - Tubes: 39.9 m^{2} (429 sq ft)
  - Flues: 33.7 m^{2} (363 sq ft)
  - Total surface: 80.3 m^{2} (864 sq ft)
- Superheater
  - Heating area: 29.0 m^{2} (312 sq ft)
- Cylinders: Two, outside
- Cylinder size: 450 mm × 400 mm (17 11/16 in × 15 3/4 in)
- Valve gear: Heusinger (Walschaerts)
- Train brakes: Körting vacuum brake Heberlein brake initially
- Couplers: Scharfenberg couplers
Performance figures
- Maximum speed: 30 km/h (19 mph)
- Indicated power: 600–750 PS (441–552 kW; 592–740 hp)
- Tractive effort: 83.35 kN (18,740 lbf)
Career
- Operators: Deutsche Reichsbahn; → Deutsche Reichsbahn (GDR)
- Numbers: DRG/DR: 99 731 – 99 762; DR from 1970: 99 1731 – 99 1762
- Retired: from 1945

The German Class 99.73-76 engines were standard locomotives (Einheitslokomotiven) in service with the Deutsche Reichsbahn for Saxony's narrow gauge railways. Together with their follow-on class, the DR Class 99.77-79, they were the most powerful narrow gauge locomotives in Germany for the 750 mm (2 ft 5 1/2 in) track gauge.

== History ==
Although there was already a very powerful locomotive for operations on the mountain lines in the Ore Mountains of eastern Germany in the shape of the ten-coupled ex-Saxon Class 99.67-71, there was a further requirement for an even more powerful class. So it fell to the newly formed Reichsbahn railway division of Dresden to procured an Einheitslok with a 750 mm (2 ft 5 1/2 in) track gauge. The Standardisation Office of the German Locomotive Union in Berlin-Tegel prepared the design for this class.

The first series of 13 locomotives was built by the Sächsische Maschinenfabrik, previously Richard Hartmann, in Chemnitz. According to the supply agreement, the Sächsische Maschinenfabrik was supposed to deliver more locos, but as a result of its bankruptcy and liquidation in 1930, this order was transferred to the Berliner Maschinenbau AG (BMAG), previously Schwartzkopff. In 1928, seven locomotives were supplied by BMAG and another twelve followed in 1933.

The locomotives were very modern for their time, and were similar in design to the standard gauge Einheitslokomotiven. The engines fulfilled expectations; by double-heading it was now possible to haul even very long (up to 56 axles) narrow gauge trains uphill.

In 1945, ten locomotives had to be given to the Soviet Union as war reparations. At the same time, there was an enormous increase in the transportation required in the Ore Mountains as a result of new uranium mines opened by SDAG Wismut. In 1952, in order to assist with the resulting shortage of locomotives, a similar follow-on class emerged, DR Class 99.77-79, built by the VEB Lokomotivbau Karl Marx in Babelsberg. At the end of the 1960s, the first Class 99.73-76 engines had to be retired due to boiler damage. Ten locomotives were given new, welded boilers and continued to work their original routes. In 1992, number 99 1760, and at some point also number 99 1750 were converted to oil-firing. No. 99 1760 was later converted back to coal power.

== Technical features ==
These ten-coupled locomotives had carrying axles housed in a Bissel bogie. The fixed third axle acted as the driving axle and had thinner wheel flanges to begin with. After 1945 its flanges were removed entirely to improve curve running still further. The wheelbase was 3,000 mm (9 ft 10 in) initially; this was later increased to 4,000 mm (13 ft 1 1/2 in).

As was typical on all Einheitslokomotiven, the engine had a Knorr feedwater preheater mounted transversely above the smokebox. The boiler was fed using Friedmann exhaust steam injectors.

Because Heberlein brakes were still partially in use at that time, the locomotives also had, on delivery, the necessary equipment for them, complete with guide rollers and winders (Haspel). The locomotive itself had a Knorr compressed-air brake which was controlled by the vacuum brake used for the train.

As the first engines were delivered in 1928, it was already planned to replace the obsolete funnel couplers by Scharfenberg couplers. So the first locomotives still had funnel couplers to begin; these were later swapped for the new couplings without any difficulty.

== Operations ==
At the outset single locomotives were even used in the Thumer Netz and in Wilsdruff. On the hilly routes of Hainsberg–Kipsdorf, Cranzahl–Oberwiesenthal and Zittau–Oybin/Jonsdorf, however, these powerful engines soon became the main prime movers.

Today the Class 99.73-76 locomotives are stationed in Zittau and Freital-Hainsberg. 2 engines are also on duty on the Lößnitzgrund Railway since the temporary closure of large parts of the Weisseritz Valley Railway due to flooding between 2002 and 2017. Since 2023 one engine, no. 99 1762, operates on the route Cranzahl–Oberwiesenthal again.

== See also ==
- List of DRG locomotives and railbuses

== Sources ==
- Ebel, Jürgen U.; Seiler, Bernd (1994). Die Baureihe 99.73-79 – Einheitslok auf schmaler Spur (in German). Freiburg: EK-Verlag. ISBN 3-88255-119-4.
- Preuß, Erich; Preuß, Rainer (1998). Schmalspurbahnen in Sachsen (in German). Stuttgart: transpress Verlag. ISBN 3-613-71079-X.
- Weisbrod, Manfred; Petznik, Wolfgang (1981). Dampflokomotiven deutscher Eisenbahnen, Baureihe 97–99 (EFA 1.4) (in German) (2nd ed.). Düsseldorf: Alba. pp. 173–176, 213. ISBN 3-87094-087-5.
