= Greifensteinite =

Beryllium phosphate mineral

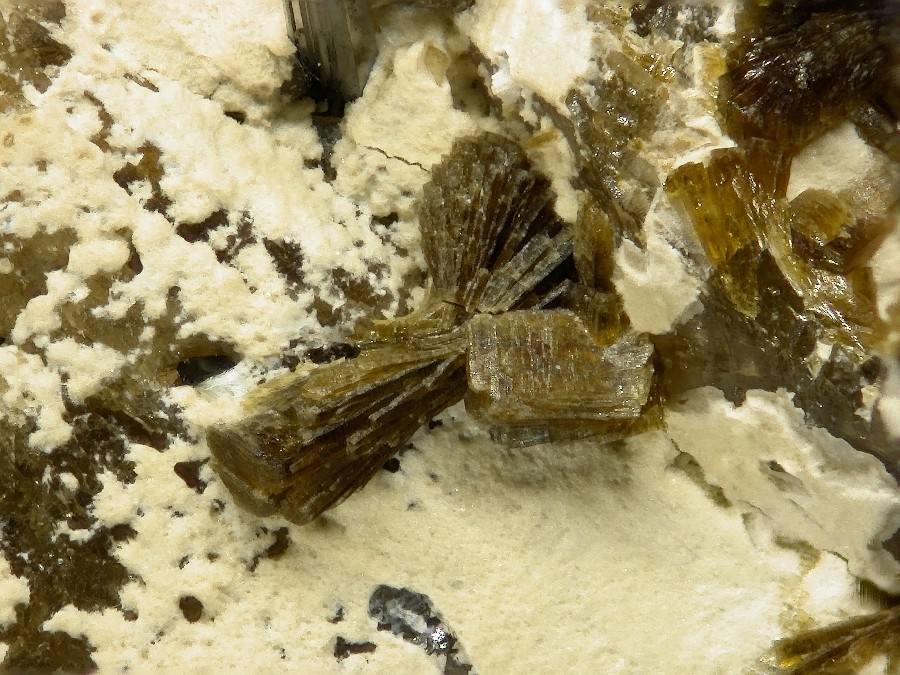
- Greifensteinite (picture size: 3 mm)

General
- Category: Phosphate mineral Roscherite group
- Formula: Ca_{2}Fe^{2+}_{5}Be_{4}(PO_{4})_{6}(OH)_{4}·6H_{2}O
- IMA symbol: Gfs
- Strunz classification: 8.DA.10
- Dana classification: 42.7.7.4
- Crystal system: Monoclinic
- Crystal class: Prismatic (2/m) (same H-M symbol)
- Space group: C2/c
- Unit cell: a = 15.903, b = 11.885 c = 6.677 [Å]; β = 94.68°; Z = 2

Identification
- Color: Yellow green, olive green, light brown
- Crystal habit: Prismatic
- Cleavage: Good on {100} (or parting on {100})
- Fracture: Uneven
- Tenacity: brittle
- Mohs scale hardness: 4.5
- Luster: Vitreous
- Streak: White, greenish
- Diaphaneity: Transparent to translucent
- Specific gravity: 2.93
- Optical properties: Biaxial (-)
- Refractive index: n_{α}: 1.624 n_{β}: 1.634 n_{γ}: 1.638
- Birefringence: 0.014
- 2V angle: 80°

Greifensteinite is beryllium phosphate mineral with formula: Ca_{2}Fe^{2+}_{5}Be_{4}(PO_{4})_{6}(OH)_{4}·6H_{2}O. It is the Fe^{2+} dominant member of the roscherite group. It crystallizes in the monoclinic crystal system and typically forms prismatic dark olive green crystals.

It was first described in Germany at Greifenstein Rocks, Ehrenfriedersdorf, and was named for the location. At the type locality, it occurs within a lithium-rich pegmatite in miarolitic cavities. It was approved by the International Mineralogical Association in 2002.
