= Auerbach, Erzgebirgskreis =

Auerbach
- Municipality
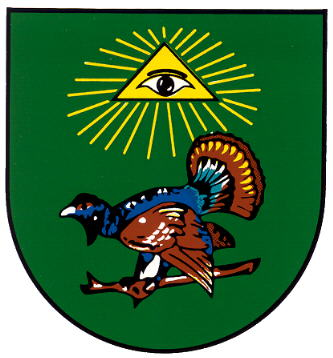
- Coat of arms

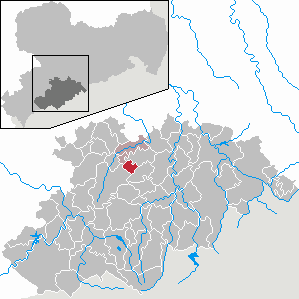
- Location of Auerbach within Erzgebirgskreis district
- Interactive map of Auerbach
- Location within Germany Location within Saxony
- Coordinates: 50°41′13″N 12°54′49″E
- Country: Germany
- State: Saxony
- District: Erzgebirgskreis

Government
  - Mayor (2018–25): Horst Kretzschmann (Ind.)

Area
  - Total: 8.28 km^{2} (3.20 sq mi)
- Elevation: 534 m (1,752 ft)

Population (2025-12-31)
  - Total: 2,264
  - Density: 273/km^{2} (708/sq mi)
- Time zone: UTC+01:00 (CET)
  - Summer (DST): UTC+02:00 (CEST)
- Postal codes: 09392
- Dialling codes: 03721
- Vehicle registration: ERZ, ANA, ASZ, AU, MAB, MEK, STL, SZB, ZP
- Website: www.auerbach-erzgebirge.de

Auerbach (German pronunciation: [ˈaʊɐbax]) is a municipality in the district Erzgebirgskreis, in Saxony, Germany. Auerbach has an area of 8.26 km² and a population of 2,897 (December 31, 2006).
