= Thermalbad Wiesenbad =

- Municipality
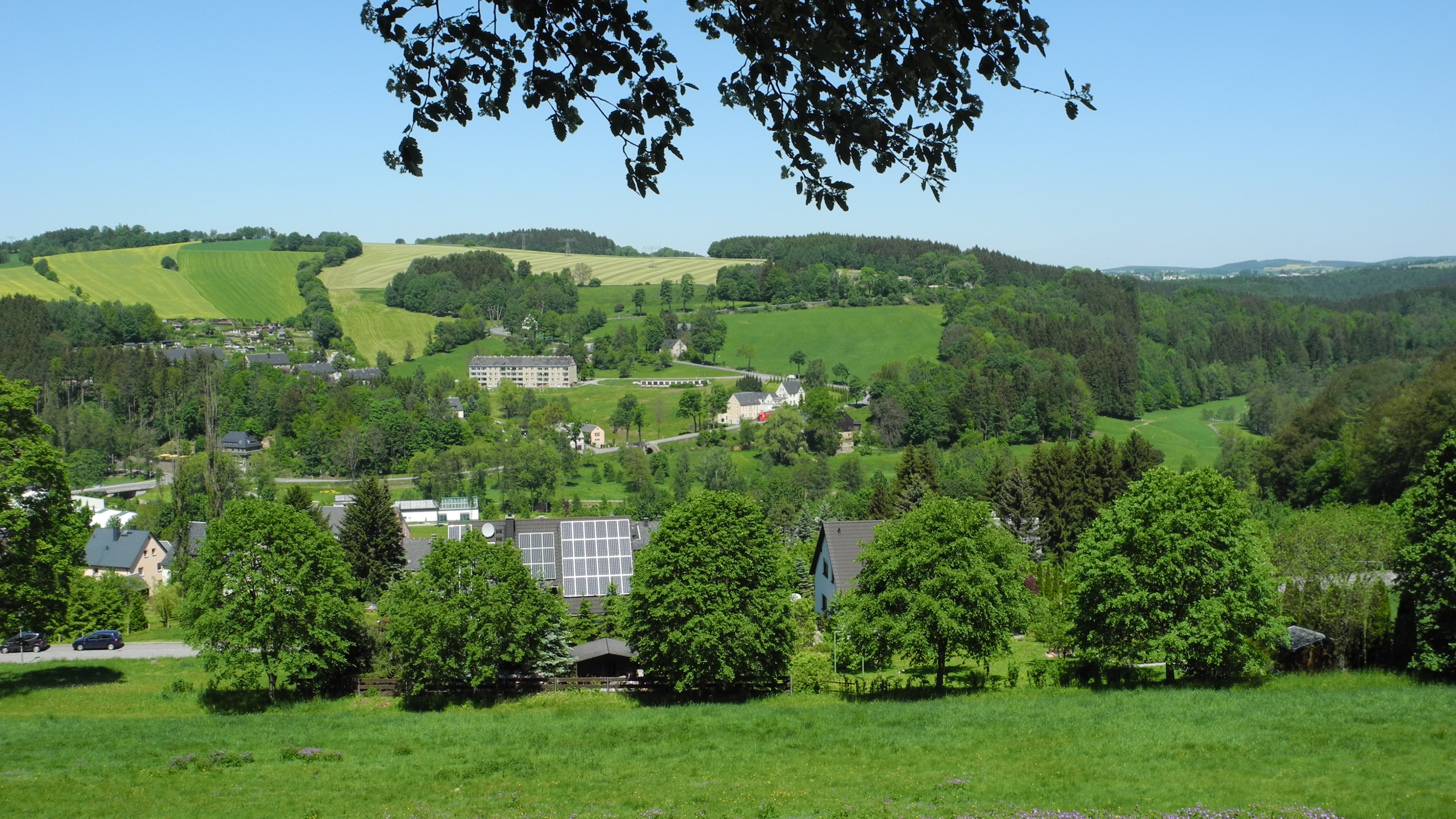
- Wiesenbad

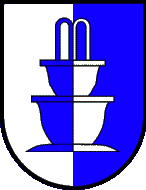
- Coat of arms

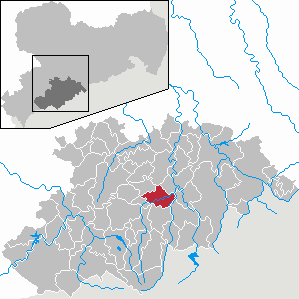
- Location of Thermalbad Wiesenbad within Erzgebirgskreis district
- Interactive map of Thermalbad Wiesenbad
- Location within Germany Location within Saxony
- Coordinates: 50°37′N 13°1′E
- Country: Germany
- State: Saxony
- District: Erzgebirgskreis
- Subdivisions: 4

Government
  - Mayor (2020–27): Thomas Mey

Area
  - Total: 24.62 km^{2} (9.51 sq mi)
- Elevation: 418 m (1,371 ft)

Population (2025-12-31)
  - Total: 3,056
  - Density: 124.1/km^{2} (321.5/sq mi)
- Time zone: UTC+01:00 (CET)
  - Summer (DST): UTC+02:00 (CEST)
- Postal codes: 09488
- Dialling codes: 03733
- Vehicle registration: ERZ, ANA, ASZ, AU, MAB, MEK, STL, SZB, ZP
- Website: www.thermalkurort.de

Thermalbad Wiesenbad is a municipality in the district of Erzgebirgskreis, in Saxony, Germany.

== History ==
From 1952 to 1990, Thermalbad Wiesenbad was part of the Bezirk Karl-Marx-Stadt of East Germany.

== Historical Population ==
On 3 October 1990 the population of the present-day municipality Thermalbad Wiesenbad was 4169. The following figures show the population on 31 December of the corresponding year.

1993 – 3938; 1994 – 3919; 1995 – 3939; 1996 – 3897; 1997 – 3910	1998 – 3937; 1999 – 3925; 2000 – 3920; 2001 – 3872; 2002 – 3876	2003 – 3844; 2004 – 3814; 2005 – 3783; 2006 – 3710; 2007 – 3674	2009 – 3587; 2012 – 3490; 2013 – 3453

Source: Statistical Office of the Free State of Saxony
