= Hormersdorf =

- Ortsteil of Zwönitz
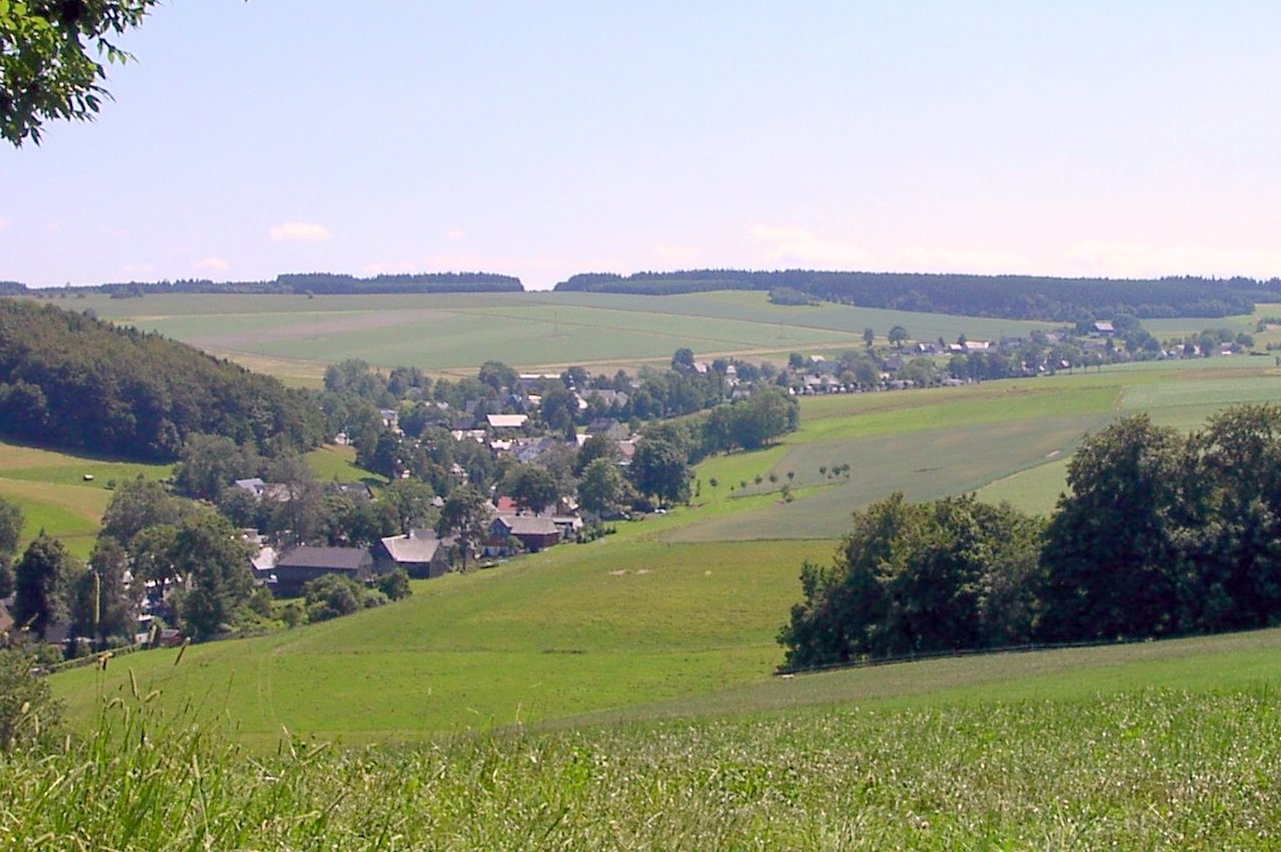

- Coat of arms
- Interactive map of Hormersdorf
- Location within Germany Location within Saxony
- Coordinates: 50°40′21″N 12°53′2″E
- Country: Germany
- State: Saxony
- District: Erzgebirgskreis
- Town: Zwönitz

Area
  - Total: 11.32 km^{2} (4.37 sq mi)
- Elevation: 500 m (1,600 ft)

Population (2011-12-31)
  - Total: 1,548
  - Density: 136.7/km^{2} (354.2/sq mi)
- Time zone: UTC+01:00 (CET)
  - Summer (DST): UTC+02:00 (CEST)
- Postal codes: 09395
- Dialling codes: 03721
- Vehicle registration: ERZ

Hormersdorf (German pronunciation: [ˈhɔʁmɐsˌdɔʁf]) is a former municipality in the district Erzgebirgskreis, in Saxony, Germany. Since 1 January 2013, it is part of the town Zwönitz.

== Dialect clock ==
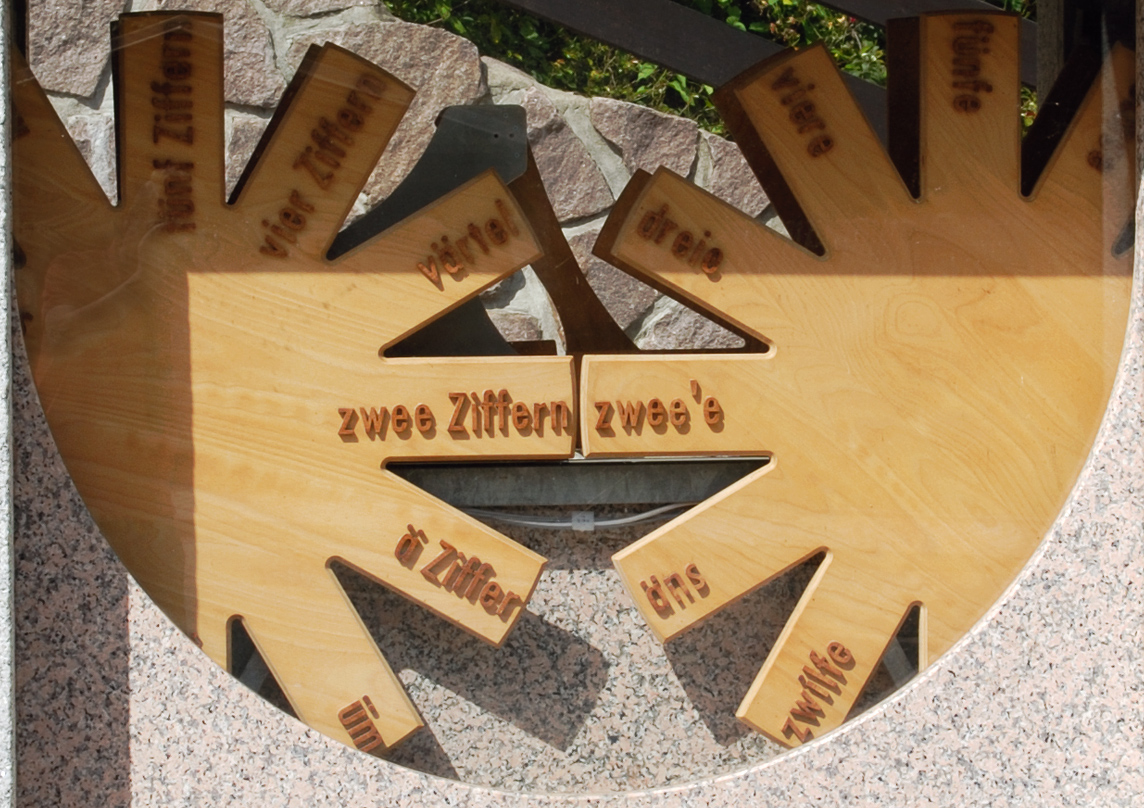
Dialect clock showing "Ziffer"s

In Hormersdorf a "Ziffern-Uhr" (Ziffer clock) was installed that displays the time of day in the local Erzgebirgisch dialect which uses the word "Ziffer" for units of five minute intervals.

The image of the clock (left) contains the phrase "zwee Ziffern zwee'e" in the dialect meaning 01:10 (literally "two Ziffers of the second hour", a "Ziffer" being five minutes, the second hour being 01:00 to 02:00 or 13:00 to 14:00 in daytime).

The left-hand wheel has twelve cogs, each showing a five minute interval (a Ziffer), from bottom to top:
üm = at or exactly;
ä Ziffer = one Ziffer or five minutes;
zwee Ziffern = two Ziffer or ten minutes;
värtel = quarter of an hour or fifteen minutes;
vier Ziffern = four Ziffer or twenty minutes;
fünf Ziffern = five Ziffer or twenty-five minutes;
The right-hand wheel also has twelve cogs, each showing a single hour, from bottom to top:
zwilfe = twelve (or "of the twelfth hour");
äns = one (or "of the first hour");
zwee'e = two (or "of the second hour");
dreie = three;
viere = four;
fünfe = five;
