= Ehrenfriedersdorf =

- Town
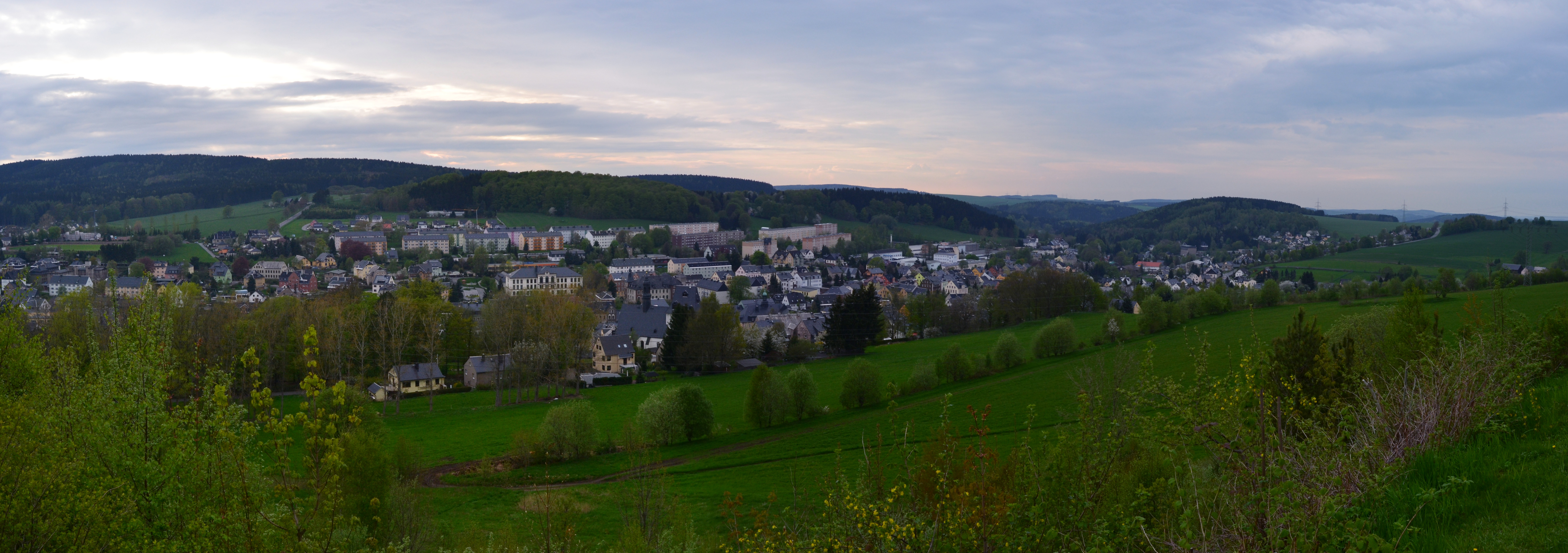

- Coat of arms

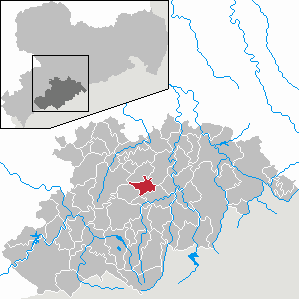
- Location of Ehrenfriedersdorf within Erzgebirgskreis district
- Interactive map of Ehrenfriedersdorf
- Location within Germany Location within Saxony
- Coordinates: 50°38′46″N 12°58′11″E
- Country: Germany
- State: Saxony
- District: Erzgebirgskreis

Government
  - Mayor (2022–29): Silke Franzl

Area
  - Total: 15.89 km^{2} (6.14 sq mi)
- Elevation: 550–731 m (1,804–2,398 ft)

Population (2025-12-31)
  - Total: 4,320
  - Density: 272/km^{2} (704/sq mi)
- Time zone: UTC+01:00 (CET)
  - Summer (DST): UTC+02:00 (CEST)
- Postal codes: 09427
- Dialling codes: 037341
- Vehicle registration: ERZ, ANA, ASZ, AU, MAB, MEK, STL, SZB, ZP
- Website: www.stadt-ehrenfriedersdorf.de

Ehrenfriedersdorf (German pronunciation: [eːʁənˈfʁiːdɐsdɔʁf]) is a town in the district of Erzgebirgskreis, in Saxony, Germany. It is situated 8 km northwest of Annaberg-Buchholz, and 21 km south of Chemnitz.

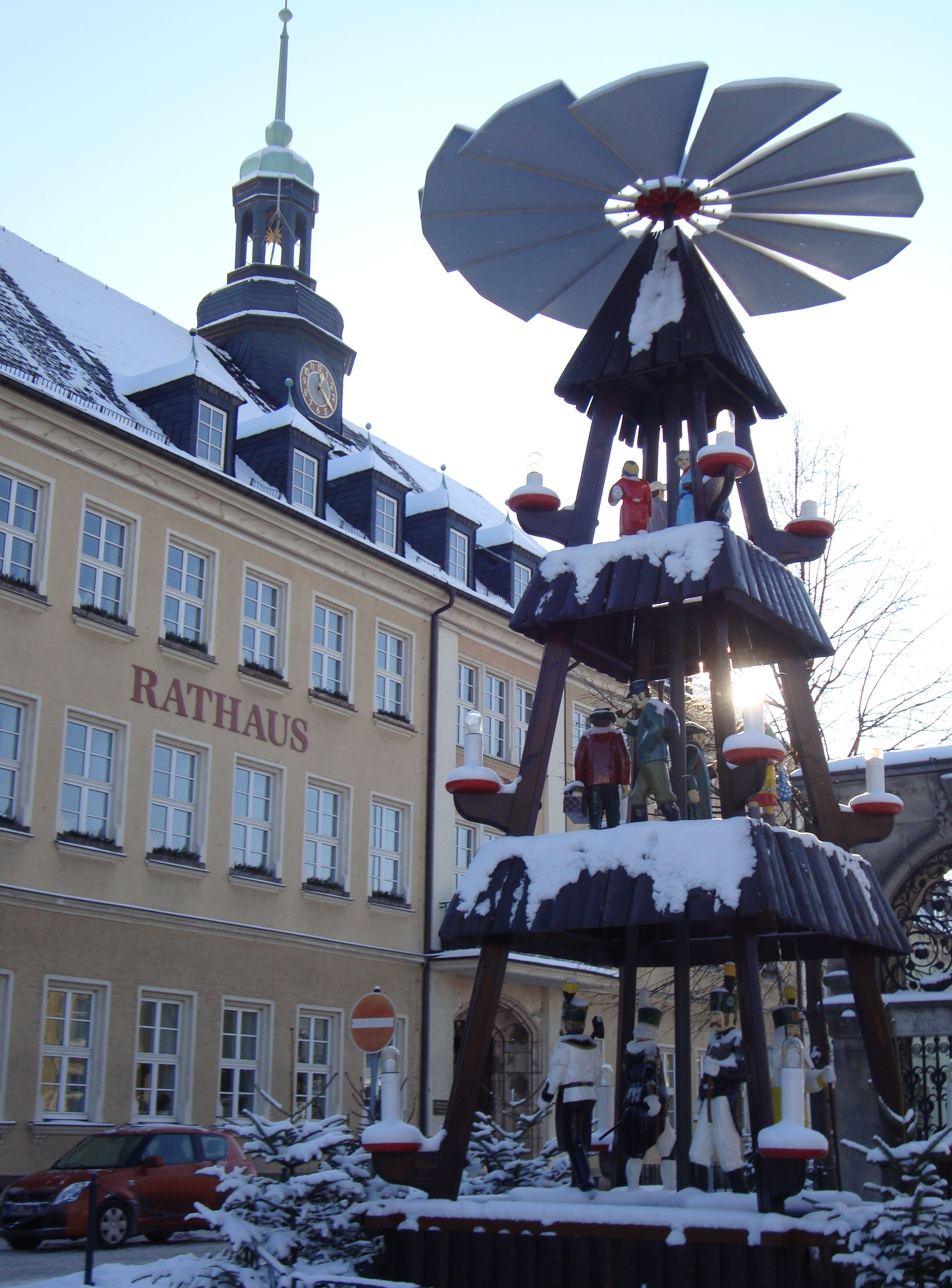
Town hall

== Theatre ==
At the start of the 1990s the folk theatre, the Mundarttheater am Greifenstein was founded in Ehrenfriedersdorf. This theatre group took over the tradition of the Mettenspiel, a play as part of the Mettenschicht, which had hitherto been put on by members of the mining fraternity in the buildings of the former tin ord mine of Sauberg .

== Notable people ==
- Georg Fritz Weiß (1822–1893), opera singer, translator and actor
- Hans Weber (1941–1969), motorcycle racer
- Günter Deckert (1950–2005), Nordic combined skier
