= Scharfenstein =

Scharfenstein may refer to:

- a district of Drebach in Erzgebirgskreis in Saxony

Scharfenstein is the name of the following geographic features:

- Scharfenstein (Ilsenburg), a mountain in the Harz Mountains of Germany
- Scharfenstein (Lusatian Mountains), Oybin in Saxony, Germany, known as the Lusatian Matterhorn
- Scharfenstein (Wernigerode), a hill in the Harz Mountains, Saxony-Anhalt, Germany
- Scharfenstein (Hesse), an extinct basalt volcano near Gudensberg, Hesse, Germany
- Scharfenstein, German name of the Slovakian mountain, Záruby

Scharfenstein is the name of:

- Scharfenstein Castle (Ore Mountains), Saxony, Germany
- Scharfenstein Castle (Kiedrich), in Kiedrich in Hesse, Germany
- German name of a castle in the Central Bohemian Uplands in Czech Republic, see Šarfenštejn Castle
- German name of Ostrý Kameň Castle in Slovakia (Hrad Ostrý Kameň)

== See also ==
- Scharfenstein Castle (disambiguation)
