= Schmiedeberg =

Schmiedeberg may refer to:

- Bad Schmiedeberg, a town in Saxony-Anhalt, Germany
- Schmiedeberg, Saxony, a municipality in Saxony, Germany
- Schmiedeberg im Riesengebirge, the German name of Kowary, Poland
- The German name of Kovářská, Czech Republic

== People with the surname ==
- Oswald Schmiedeberg (1838–1921), German pharmacologist
