= Scharfenstein Castle =

Scharfenstein Castle may refer to:

- Scharfenstein Castle (Kiedrich),
- Scharfenstein Castle (Ore Mountains)
