= Drebach Observatory =

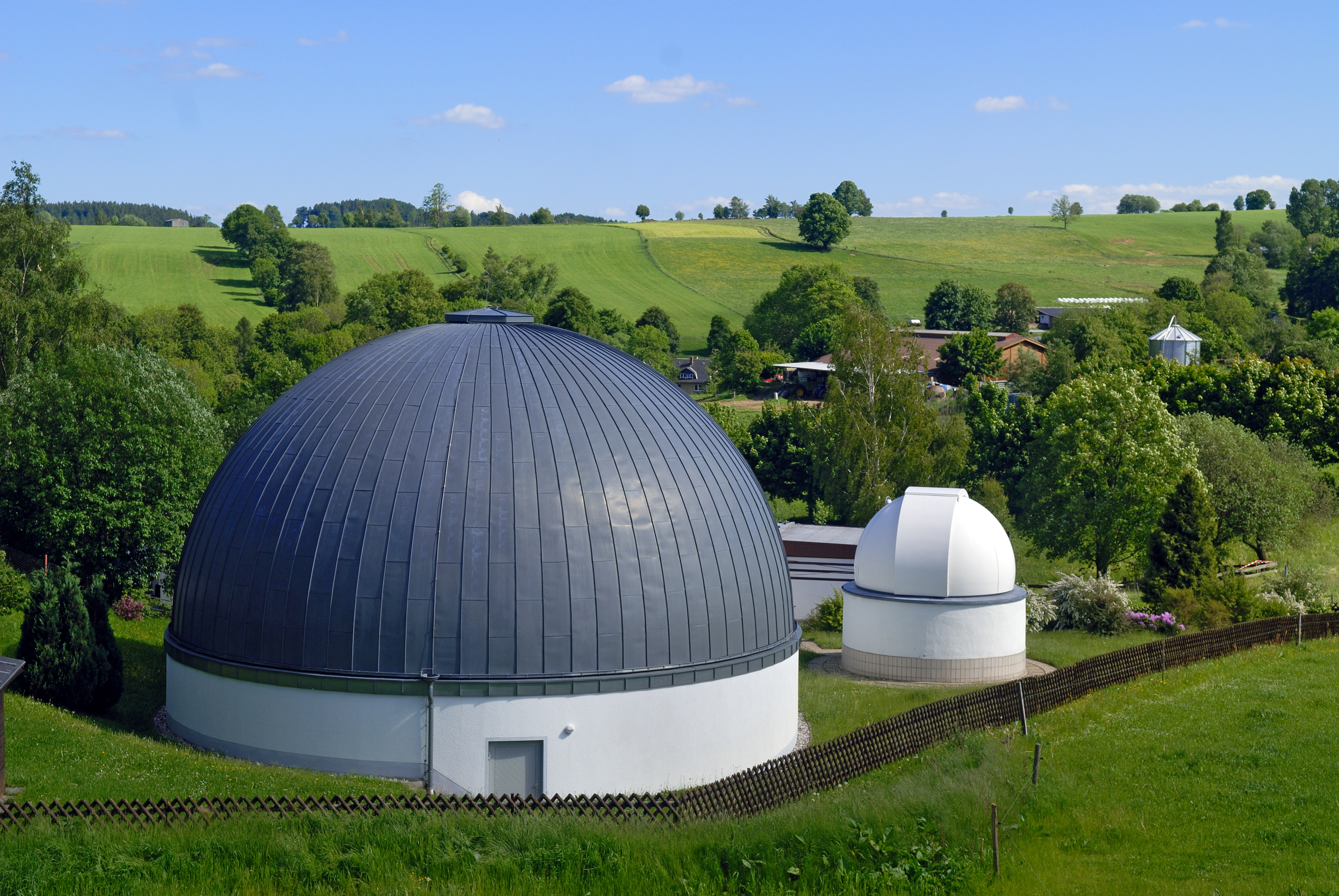
- Alternative names: Volkssternwarte Drebach
- Observatory code: 113
- Location: Drebach, Erzgebirgskreis, Saxony, Germany
- Coordinates: 50°40′26″N 13°00′46″E
- Altitude: 492 m (1,614 ft)
- Established: 3 July 1969
- Website: www.sternwarte-drebach.de
- Location of Drebach Observatory
- Related media on Commons

The Drebach Observatory (officially Zeiss Observatory Drehbach, formerly Drehbach Popular Observatory) is a planetarium and astronomical observatory (obs. code: 113) owned and operated by the municipality of Drebach, Saxony, Germany.

The planetarium uses a ZKP-3 Skymaster Zeiss projector. The observatory is equipped with a 50-centimetre Cassegrain reflector.

== Description ==
The Drebach Observatory is a non-profit cultural and educational institution in the center of the municipality of Drebach. It is located in the Ore Mountains in Saxony, Germany. The primary school "David Rebentrost" and the sports field are in the immediate vicinity of the facility.

== Gallery ==
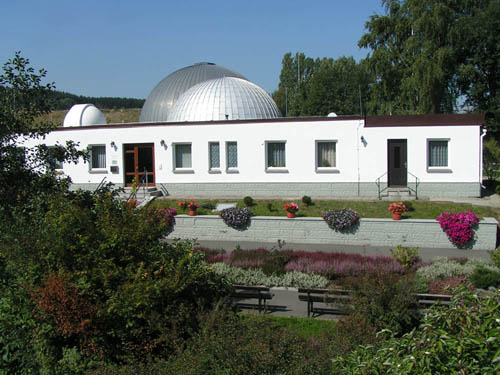
Zeiss-Planetarium and Volkssternwarte Drebach

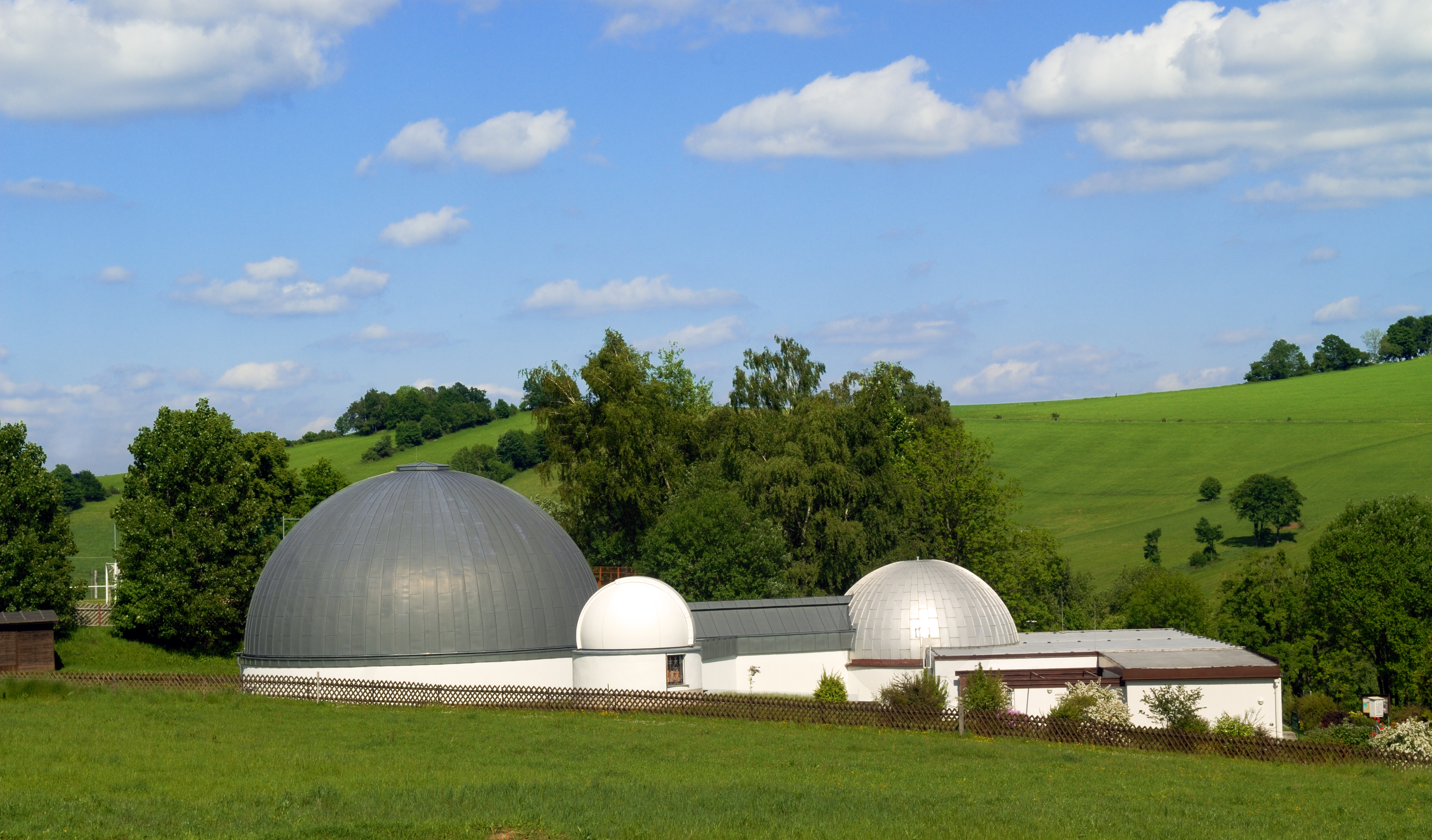
Drebach Observatory

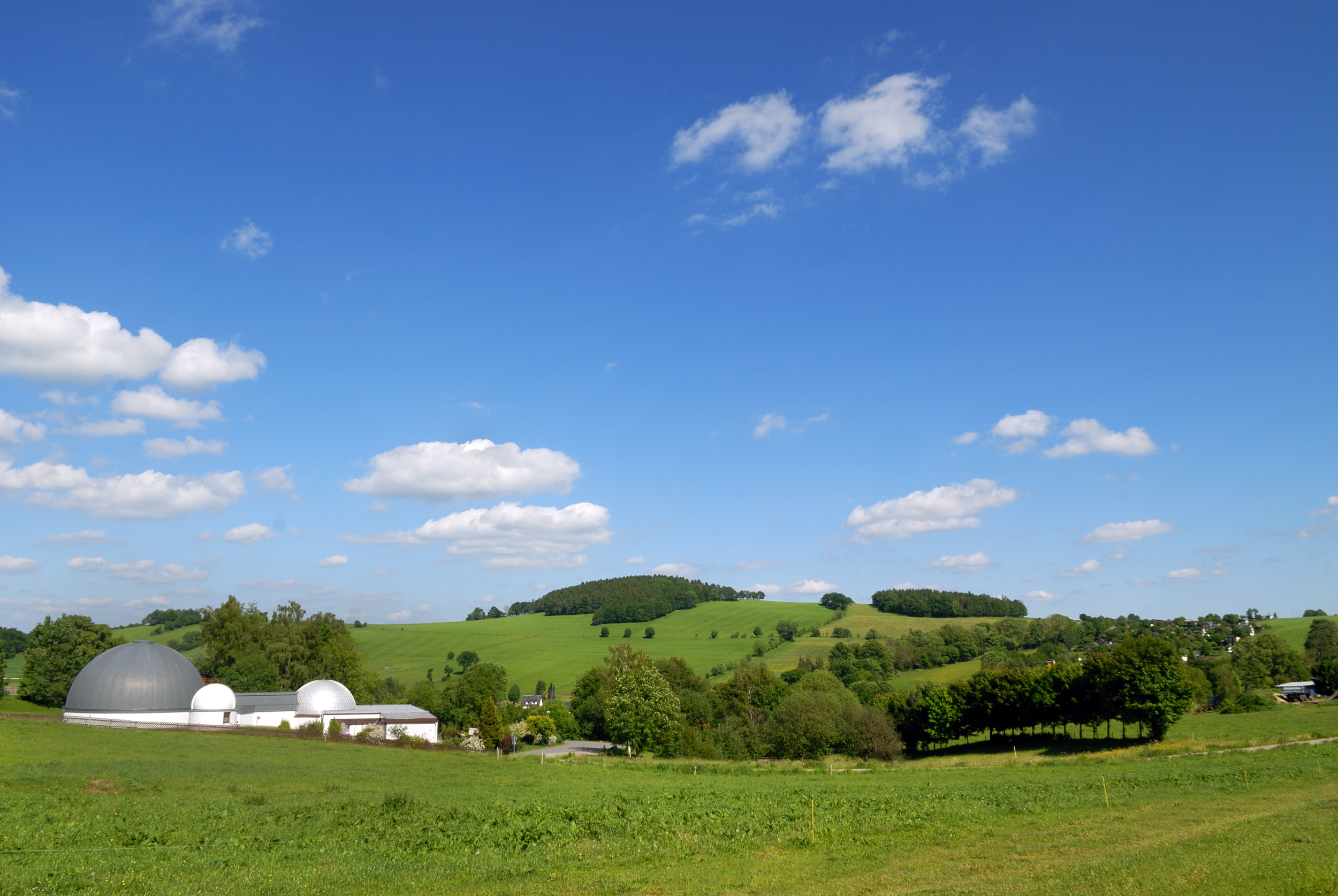
Drebach Observatory and surroundings

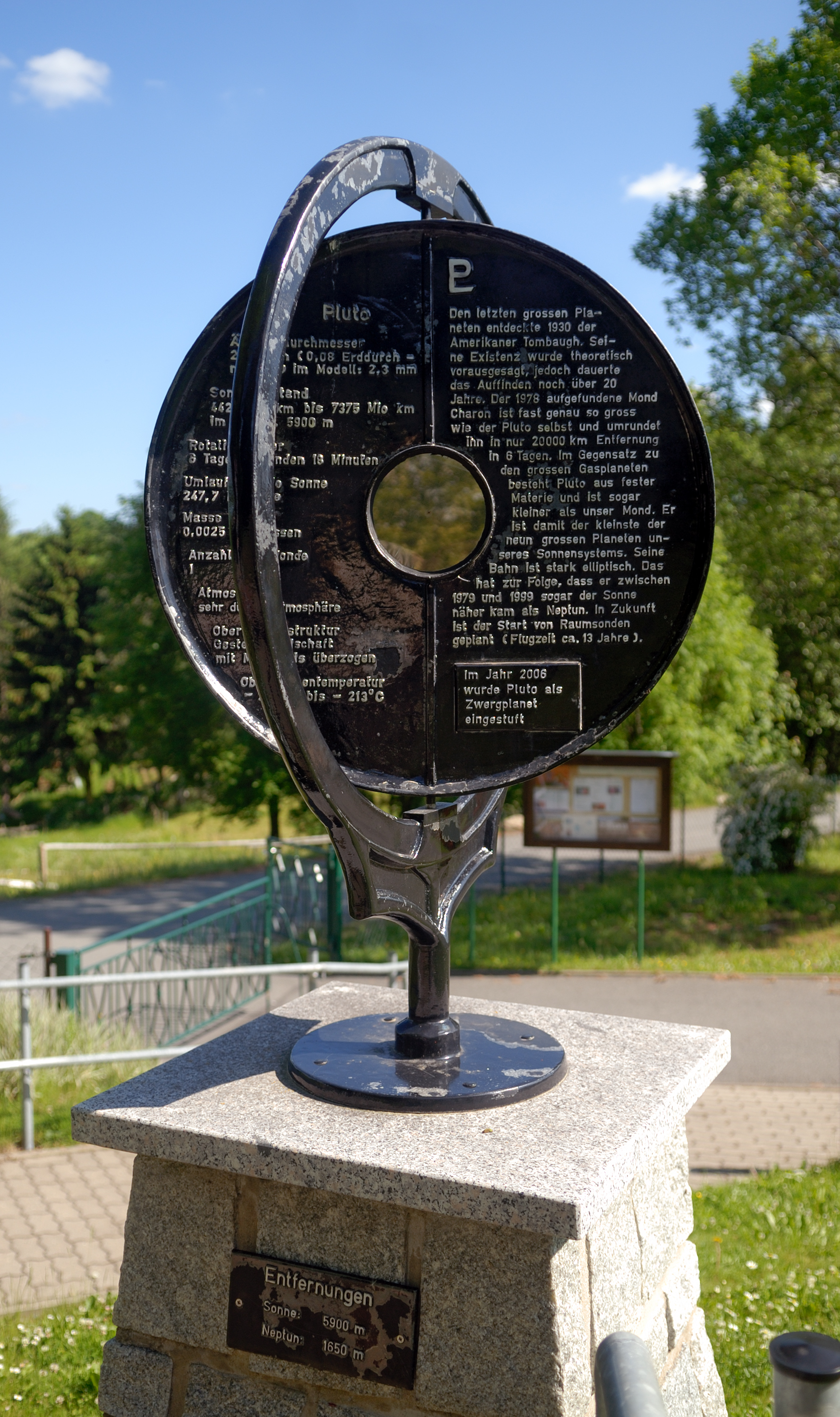
Solar System hiking trail: Pluto

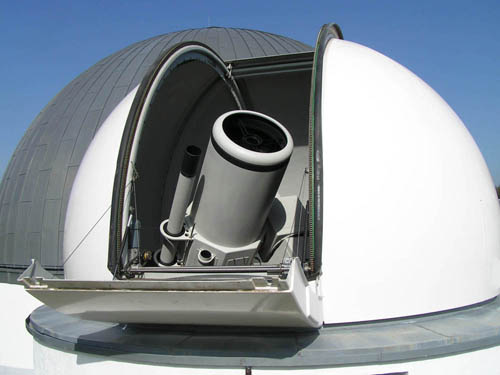
The observatory's 50 cm reflector

== See also ==
- List of planetariums § Germany
