= Air battle over the Ore Mountains =

1944 battle between US and German air forces

Coordinates: 50°26′19″N 13°3′28″E

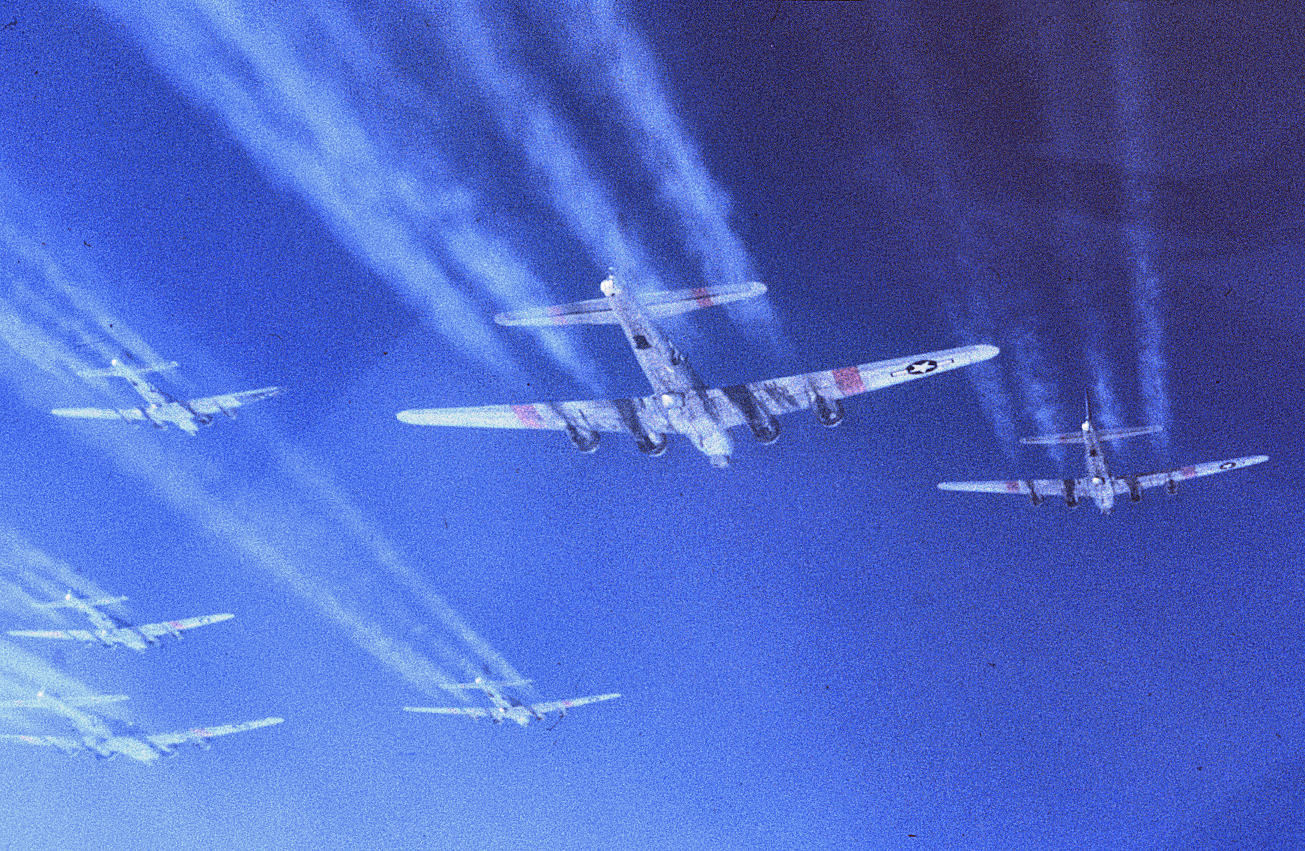
Formation of B-17G bombers and their distinctive vapour trails

The Air battle over the Ore Mountains (German: Luftschlacht über dem Erzgebirge) took place around midday on 11 September 1944 between German and American air forces over the crest of the Ore Mountains near the village of Oberwiesenthal, above the Bohemian market town of Schmiedeberg (today Kovářská in the Czech Republic).

== Course of the battle ==
In 1944 many Allied air raids had the aim of destroying the synthetic oil manufacturing facilities of the German oil industry where important military fuels were manufactured for aircraft and vehicles from coal. On 11 September 1944, the Americans launched Mission 623. This had ten primary targets, including Leuna (Merseburg), Lützkendorf, Magdeburg, Misburg (the Deurag-Nerag factory), Hanover, Böhlen, Brüx, Ruhland and Chemnitz. The bombing of Chemnitz was also part of Operation Frantic. In case of bad weather many other alternative targets were chosen. In all, 1,131 bombers were deployed, accompanied by 440 fighter aircraft for protection.

The Schwarzheide Synthesis Factory (Synthesewerk Schwarzheide or Hydrierwerk BRABAG) in Ruhland-Schwarzheide was Target No. 7. It was assigned to the 100th Bomber Group, known as the "Bloody Hundredth" due to its heavy losses. It was part of the US Eighth Air Force and was stationed at RAF Thorpe Abbotts near Diss in England. They flew in a formation of 36, four-engined, B-17G Flying Fortress heavy bombers, belonging to the 349th, 350th, 351st and 418th Bomber Squadrons. The bomber group approached from the west and flew at great height over Germany and initially without fighter escort. However, the plan was that they would rendezvous with US P-51D Mustang fighters of the 55th and 339th Fighter Groups over the crest of the Ore Mountains. The US Mustangs had taken off from RAF Horham.

The Germans were alerted to the incoming American aircraft and scrambled a formation of 60 Focke-Wulf Fw 190A and Messerschmitt Bf 109G fighter aircraft from the airfields at Alteno and Welzow. These were II and III Group of Jagdgeschwader 4. By 11:40 hours, US and German fighters were engaged in heavy dogfighting south of Oberhof in Thuringia, in which 6 Germans and 2 Americans died. One of the dead, Lt. William Lewis, was not discovered until 2002 following an intensive search.

The main battle then took place east of the Fichtelberg on the Bohemian side of the mountains. The Ore Mountain area had, until this point, been relatively unaffected by the fighting. Over Schmiedeberg the German Jagdgeschwader struck before the rendezvous took place and surprised the bombers in the middle of their long-distance flight. Within a very short space of time they shot down 14 US bombers and damaged others. Shortly thereafter the US fighters reached the area. They engaged the mainly young and inexperienced German fighter pilots – many on their operational first sortie – in aggressive battles. The ensuing dogfights between the fighters allowed the remaining bombers to escape. Four US pilots were shot down against 37 German fighter pilots.

Four US bombers blew up and crashed, burning, in and near Schmiedeberg. Boss Lady broke up in the air, its tail falling onto the roof of the girls' school during lessons, where it stayed embedded. Other bomber crash sites were near Crottendorf, Kretscham-Rothensehma, Neudorf, Gottesgab (Boží Dar), Tellerhäuser and Schmalzgrube. Even more scattered were the fighter crash sites. Four near Schmiedeberg, five near Weipert (Vejprty), but also at Bärenstein, Mildenau, Zschopau, Grumbach, Sehma, Reitzenhain, Kühnhaide, Grießbach and Börnichen/Erzgeb.

The remaining US bombers were able to reach their target and drop 53 t (58 short tons) of bombs on the synthesis factory.

== Losses ==
- 19 US aircraft lost (15 B-17G, 4 P-51D)
- 37 German fighters lost (18 Fw 190A, 19 BF 109G)
- 50 Americans killed, 54 captured
- 29 German pilots killed, 11 seriously injured
