= Kovářská =

- Market town
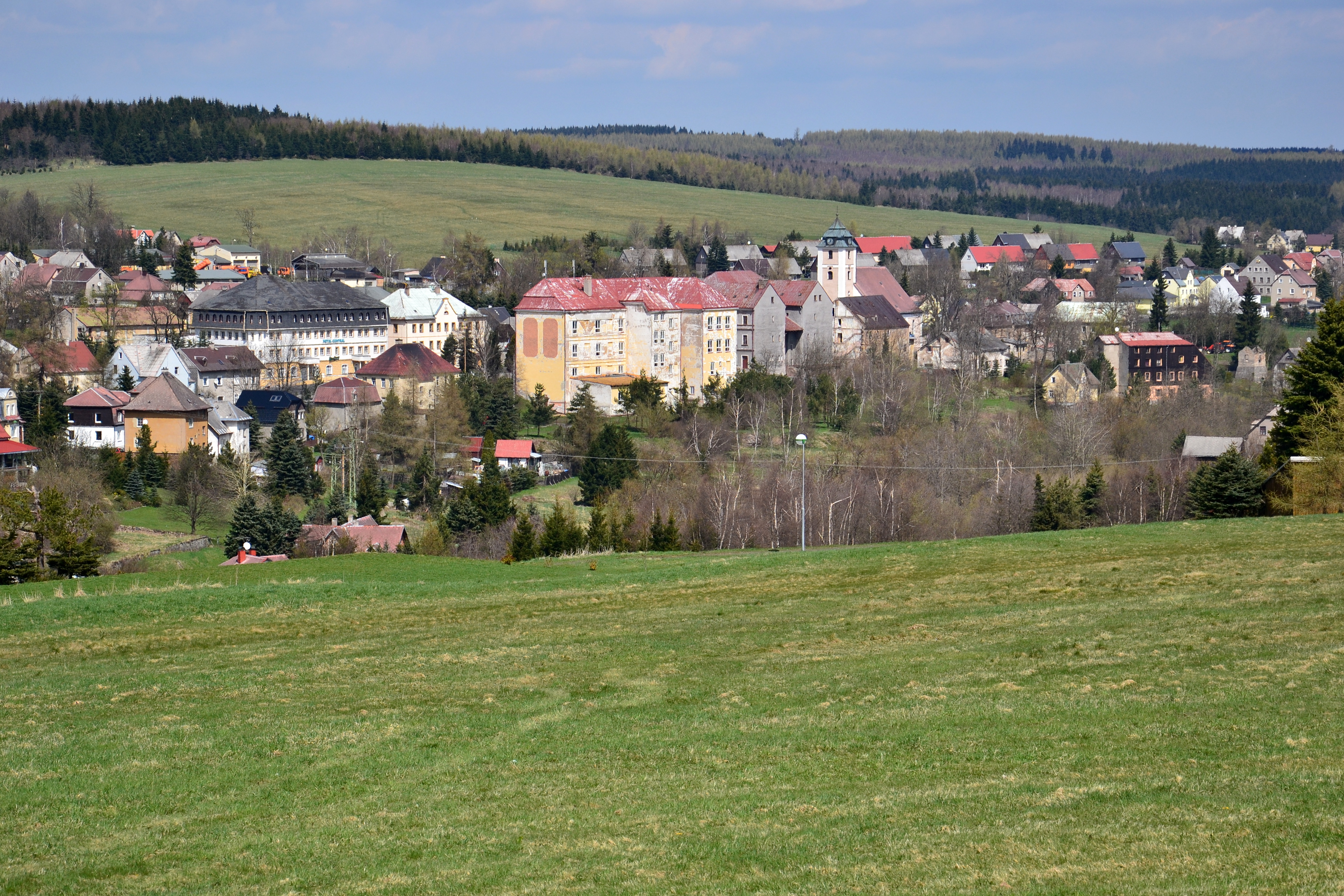
- View from the south

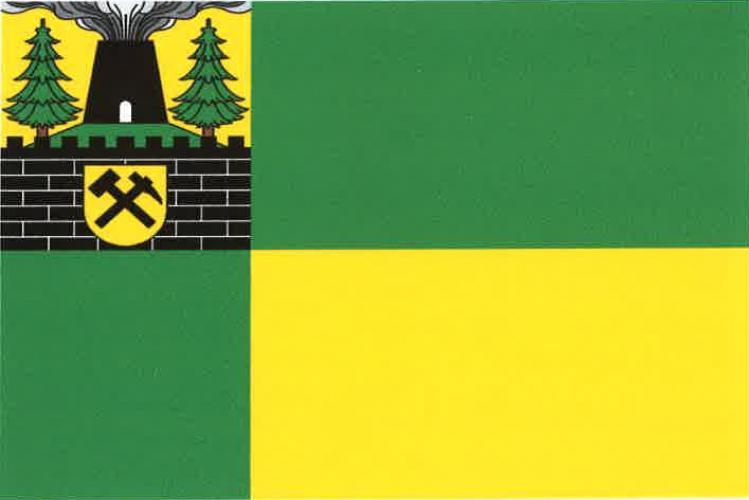
- Flag Coat of arms

- Location in the Czech Republic
- Coordinates: 50°26′18″N 13°3′14″E
- Country: Czech Republic
- Region: Ústí nad Labem
- District: Chomutov
- First mentioned: 1555

Area
  - Total: 20.86 km^{2} (8.05 sq mi)
- Elevation: 815 m (2,674 ft)

Population (2026-01-01)
  - Total: 966
  - Density: 46.3/km^{2} (120/sq mi)
- Time zone: UTC+1 (CET)
  - Summer (DST): UTC+2 (CEST)
- Postal code: 431 86
- Website: www.kovarska.cz

Kovářská (Czech pronunciation: [ˈkovaːr̝̊skaː]; German: Schmiedeberg) is a market town in Chomutov District in the Ústí nad Labem Region of the Czech Republic. It has about 1,000 inhabitants.

== Etymology ==
Both the Czech and German names refer to the processing of iron ore, with which the town is historically connected. The historical German name Schmiedeberg means 'smithy hill'. The Czech name Kovářská was introduced after World War II, meaning 'smith's'.

== Geography ==
Kovářská is located about 25 kilometres (16 mi) west of Chomutov and 26 km (16 mi) northeast of Karlovy Vary. It lies in the Ore Mountains. There are several peaks with an altitude above 900 m, the highest of which is Kamenný vrch at 963 m (3,159 ft). The stream Černá voda flows through the market town and forms a valley.

== History ==
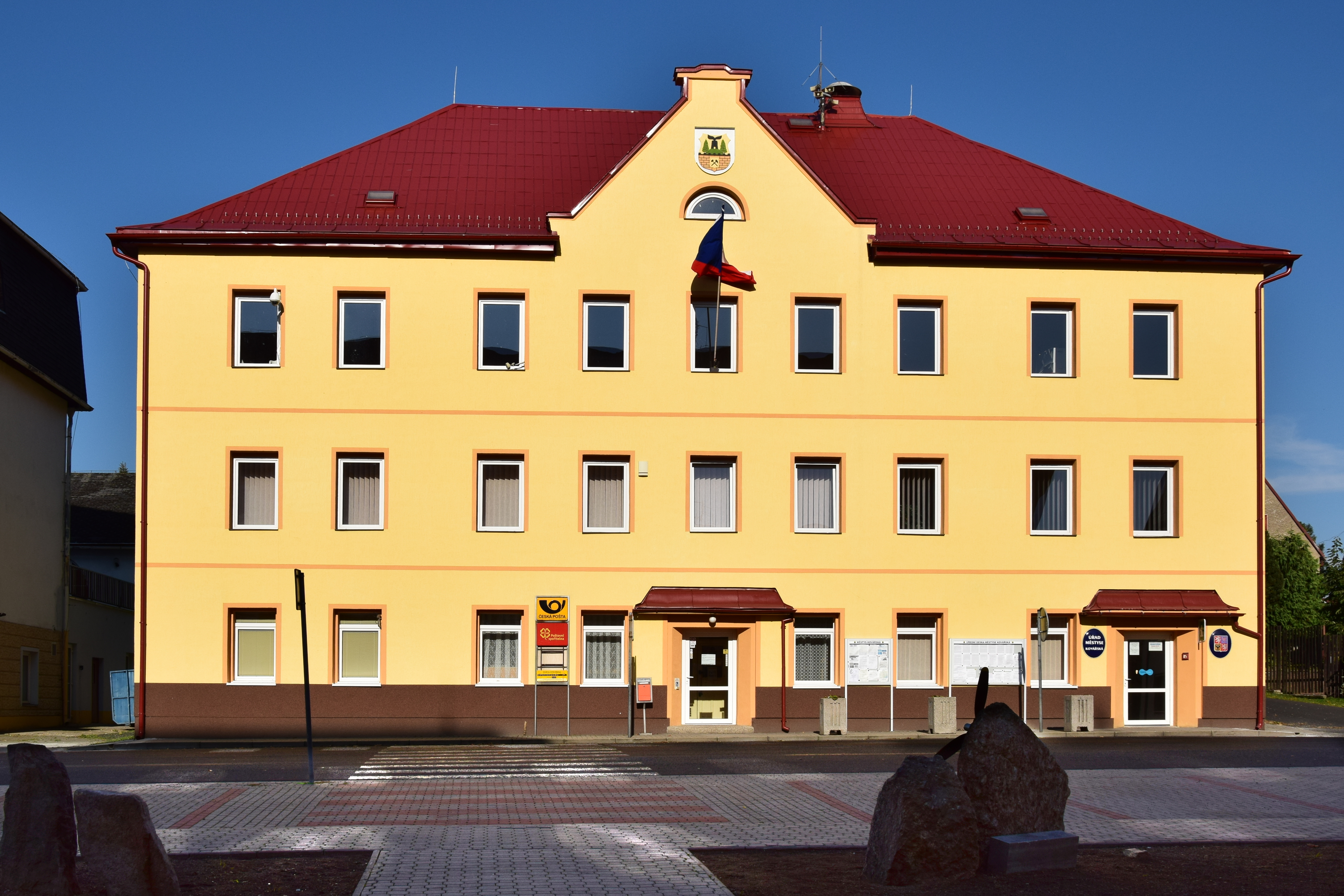
Municipal office

The origin of Kovářská is associated with the mining and processing of iron ore. Until the 19th century, it was almost the only source of livelihood for the locals. In 1599, one of the first blast furnaces in Bohemia was built here.

With the development of iron production, the village flourished. However, it was interrupted by post-White Mountain confiscations, subsequent re-Catholicisation, when Protestants went to Saxony rather than renounce their faith, and then the Thirty Years' War, which hit Kovářská severely, especially in 1639–1641.

Iron processing recovered after the war and then again after the famine in 1772. In 1780, Kovářská had almost 2,000 inhabitants. However, after the Napoleonic Wars the iron processing was maintained only with difficulty, and after several decades the operation was stopped. The town has reoriented itself to other types of industry: production of canned fish, matches, velvet, yarn and thread. In 1883, Kovářská became a market town.

On 11 September 1944, one of the greatest air battles of World War II over the territory of Czechoslovakia, the "Air battle over the Ore Mountains", took place over Kovářská. After World War II, the German-speaking population was expelled.

== Demographics ==
Historical population

Year	Pop.	±%
1869	2,942	—
1880	3,467	+17.8%
1890	3,944	+13.8%
1900	4,159	+5.5%
1910	4,443	+6.8%

Year	Pop.	±%
1921	3,998	−10.0%
1930	4,297	+7.5%
1950	2,122	−50.6%
1961	1,636	−22.9%
1970	1,343	−17.9%

Year	Pop.	±%
1980	1,614	+20.2%
1991	1,425	−11.7%
2001	1,401	−1.7%
2011	1,106	−21.1%
2021	940	−15.0%

Source: Censuses

== Transport ==
Kovářská is located on the railway line Chomutov–Cranzahl. However, trains run on it only on weekends in the summer season.

== Culture ==
Since 1994, an annual international meeting of aviation veterans is organised in Kovářská.

== Sights ==
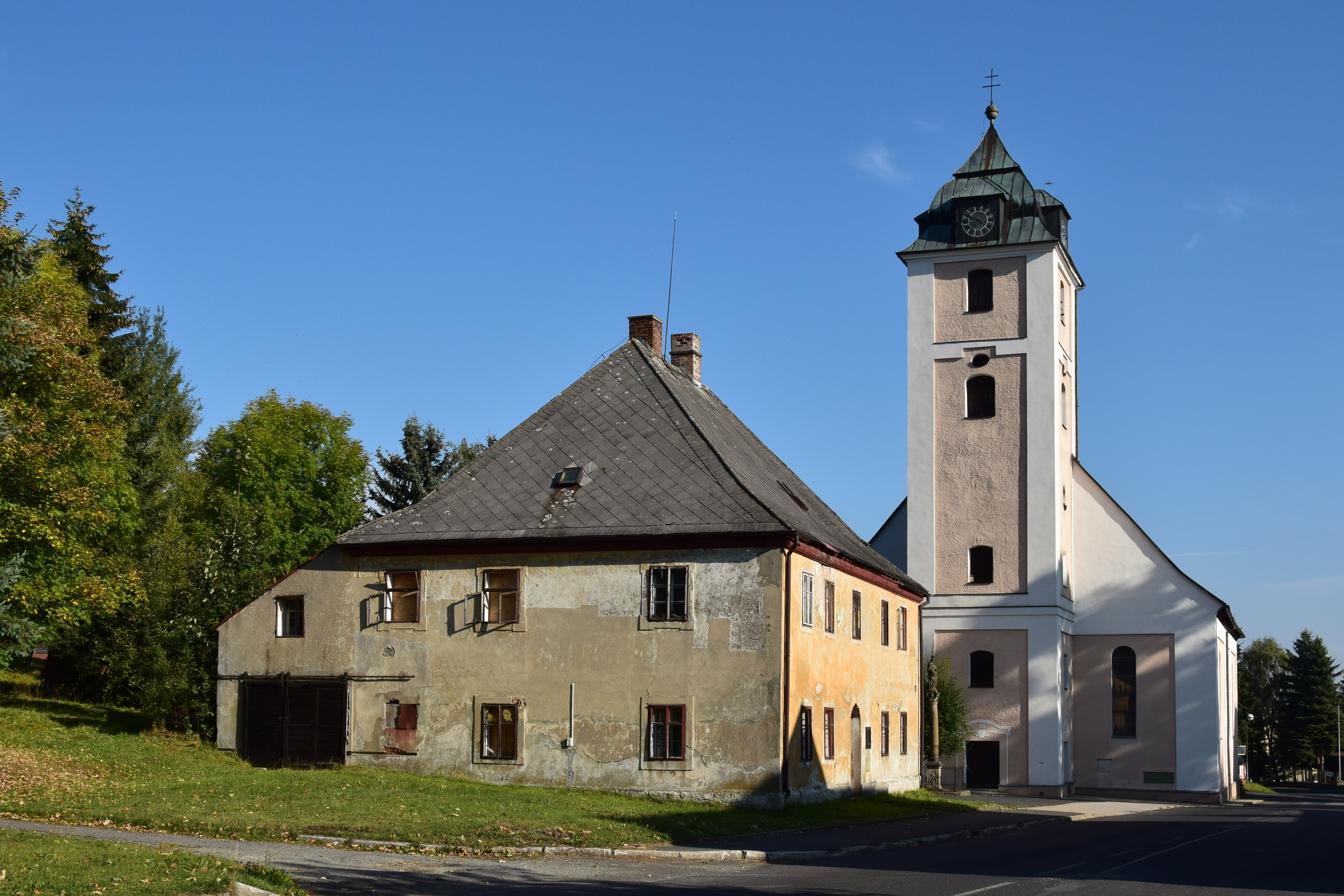
Church of Saint Michael with the rectory

The main landmark of Kovářská is the Church of Saint Michael. It was built in the Baroque style in 1709–1710. In front of the church is a Baroque Marian column from 1706.

A museum dedicated to the Air battle over the Ore Mountains (and to air wars in 1939–1945 overall) is located in Kovářská.

== Twin towns – sister cities ==
Kovářská is twinned with:

- Sehmatal, Germany
