= Venusberg, Saxony =

Venusberg
- Ortsteil of Drebach
- Interactive map of Venusberg
- Location within Germany Location within Saxony
- Coordinates: 50°42′N 13°1′E
- Country: Germany
- State: Saxony
- District: Erzgebirgskreis
- Municipality: Drebach

Area
  - Total: 11.30 km^{2} (4.36 sq mi)
- Elevation: 450 m (1,480 ft)

Population (2006-12-31)
  - Total: 2,334
  - Density: 206.5/km^{2} (535.0/sq mi)
- Time zone: UTC+01:00 (CET)
  - Summer (DST): UTC+02:00 (CEST)
- Postal codes: 09430
- Dialling codes: 03725
- Vehicle registration: ERZ

Venusberg is a village and a former municipality in the district Erzgebirgskreis, in Saxony, Germany. Since 1 January 2010, it is part of the municipality Drebach.

== History ==
In 1945 there was a concentration camp in Venusberg. 1000 Jewish women had to work for the Junkers airplane factory called "Venuswerke".

== Literature ==
Cziborra, Pascal. KZ Venusberg. Der verschleppte Tod. Lorbeer Verlag. Bielefeld 2008 ISBN 978-3-938969-04-5
