= Scharfenstein Castle (Ore Mountains) =

- Burg Scharfenstein
- Drebach-Scharfenstein
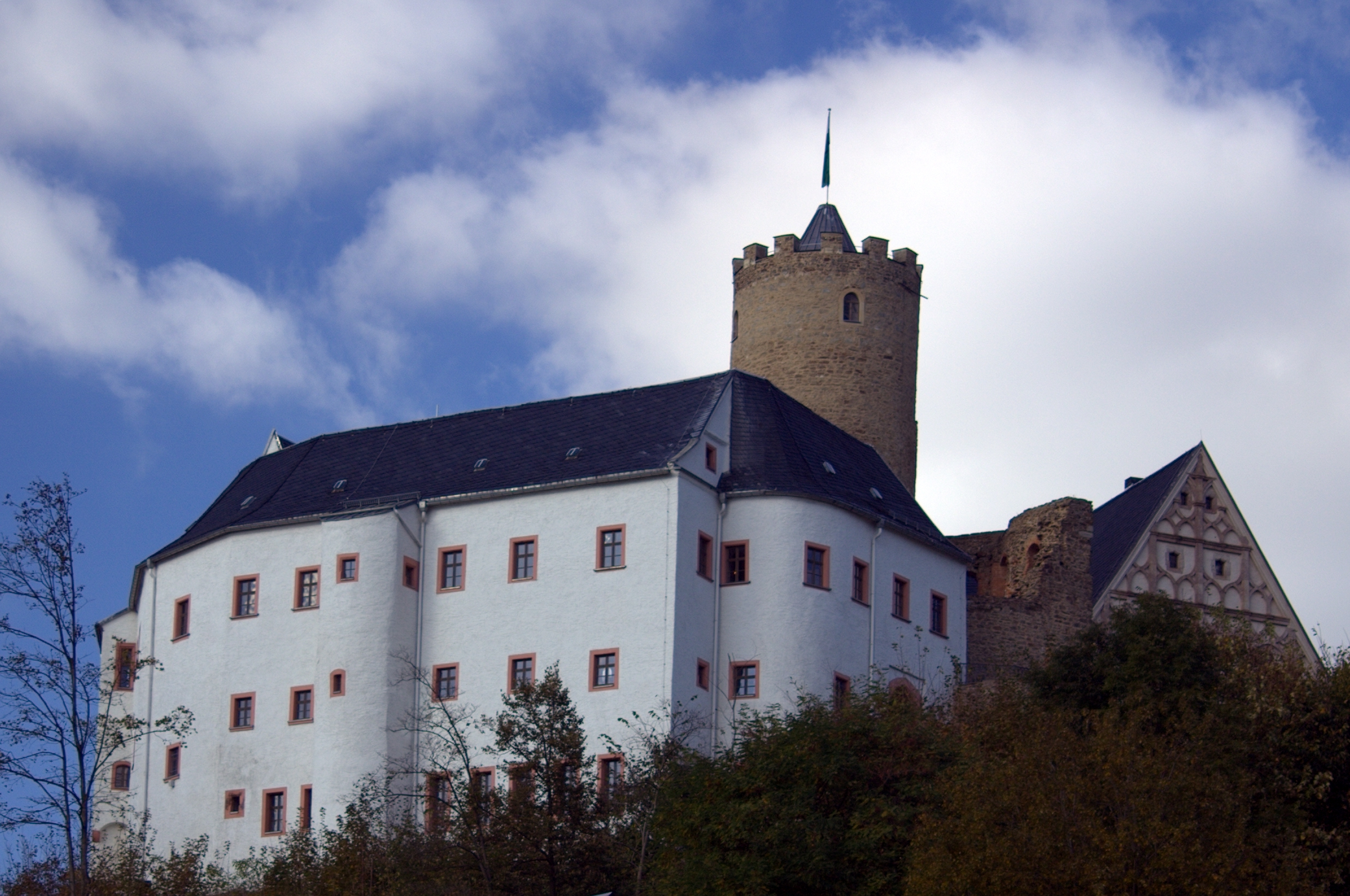
- Scharfenstein Castle

Site information
- Type: hill castle, spur castle
- Code: DE-SN
- Condition: preserved or largely preserved

Location
- Coordinates: 50°42′17″N 13°03′18″E

Site history
- Built: around 1250

Garrison information
- Occupants: nobility

Scharfenstein Castle (German: Burg Scharfenstein) lies on an elongated hill spur above the village of Scharfenstein, in the municipality of Drebach in the Ore Mountains of Saxony, Germany. The castle is one of 24 sites run by the state-owned State Palaces, Castles and Gardens of Saxony (Staatliche Schlösser, Burgen und Gärten Sachsen).

== History ==
The original structure was built in 1250. It is suspected that the von Waldenburgs ordered its construction, but only its first owner occupant is known for certain.
The von Waldenburgs had in their possession the estates of Waldenburg, Rabenstein, Scharfenstein, and Wolkenstein, which covered a contiguous area extending from the middle reaches of the River Pleiße to the Ore Mountain crest. Nine villages paid duties to the lord of the castle, including Grießbach, Großolbersdorf, Drebach and Herold. When, in the 15th century, Greifenstein Castle was destroyed, Scharfenstein also took over the guardianship of Thum, Ehrenfriedersdorf and Geyer. As a result, its value increased, so that in 1439 the Elector acquired the area from the Waldenburgs who were heavily indebted to him.
On 26 January 1492 Henry of Einsiedel bought Scharfenstein Castle and its associated villages of Grießbach, Großolbersdorf, Grünau, Hohndorf Hopfgarten and Scharfenstein It remained in the family until 1931.

Following a fire during the night of 1/2 June 1921 the entire residential wing and part of the domestic wing was destroyed. From 1921 to 1923 the damaged wings were partially rebuilt to plans by Bodo Ebhardt, based on the old design.

In 1931, a factory owner, Captain Eulitz from Fährbrücke, acquired possession. By his efforts in 1932 in a bird observatory was established. Hundreds of nest boxes were put up throughout the 325 hectares of woodland on the estate; bird banding was carried out and scientific reports published, with the support of the Chemnitz Ornithological Society.
In 1945 this forest was seized and made public property, the castle was initially used as the mining school for the state-owned Wismut mining company and, in 1951, a special children's home was established here for maladjusted boys. In 1967, it was converted into a detention centre for juvenile delinquents. Ornithological work was undertaken by the museum at Augustusburg Castle.

In 1993 the castle was taken over by the Saxon Palace Department of the Free State of Saxony (Freistaat Sachsen – Sächsische Schlösserverwaltung). In the period that followed the castle was renovated as a historic monument and converted into a museum. In 1995, on the completion of the renovation work, various exhibitions were opened - and for the first time since 1945, the castle was again open to the public. The bergfried is still used today as an observation tower.

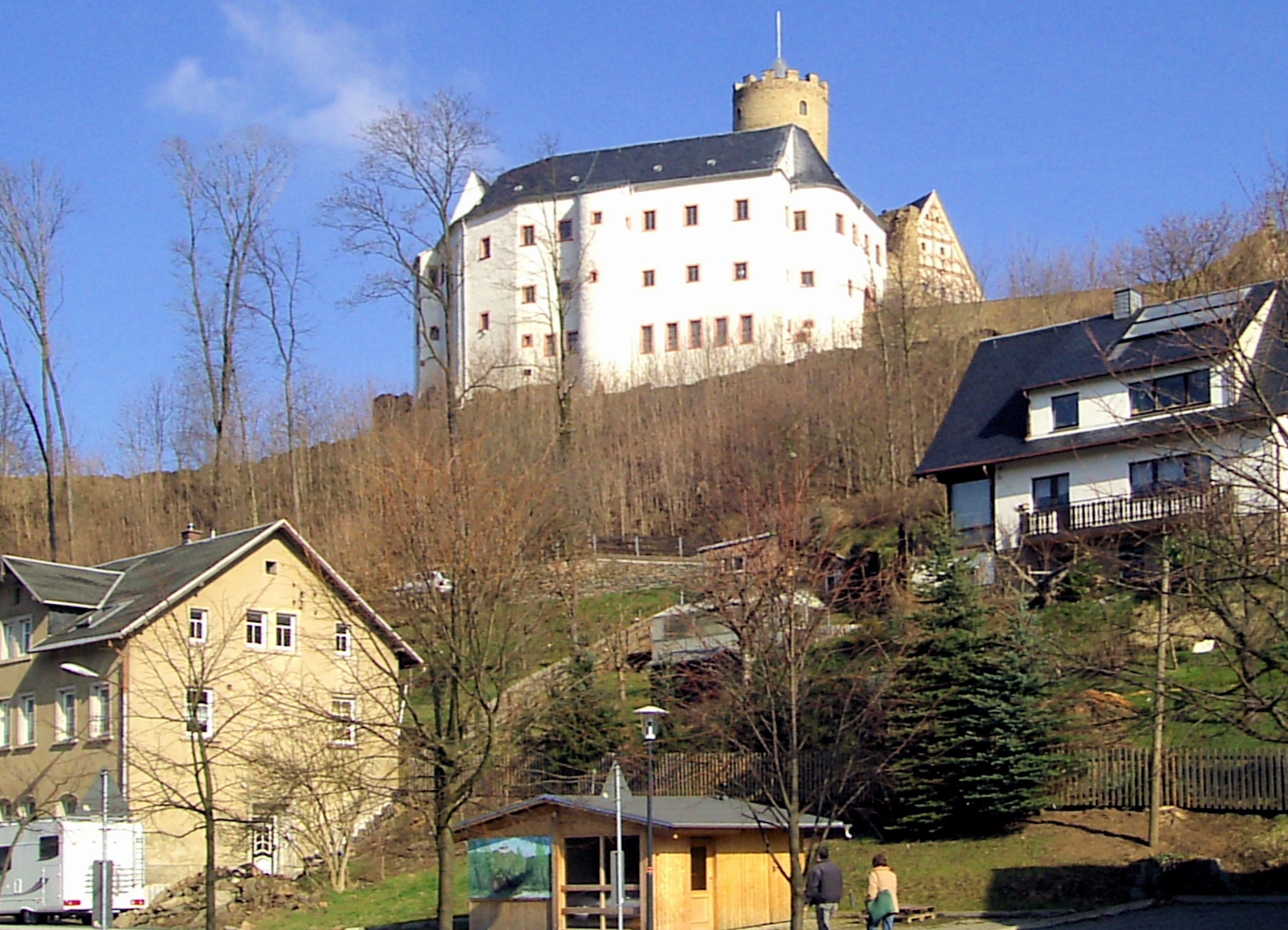
Zschopautal - Blick auf die Burg Scharfenstein

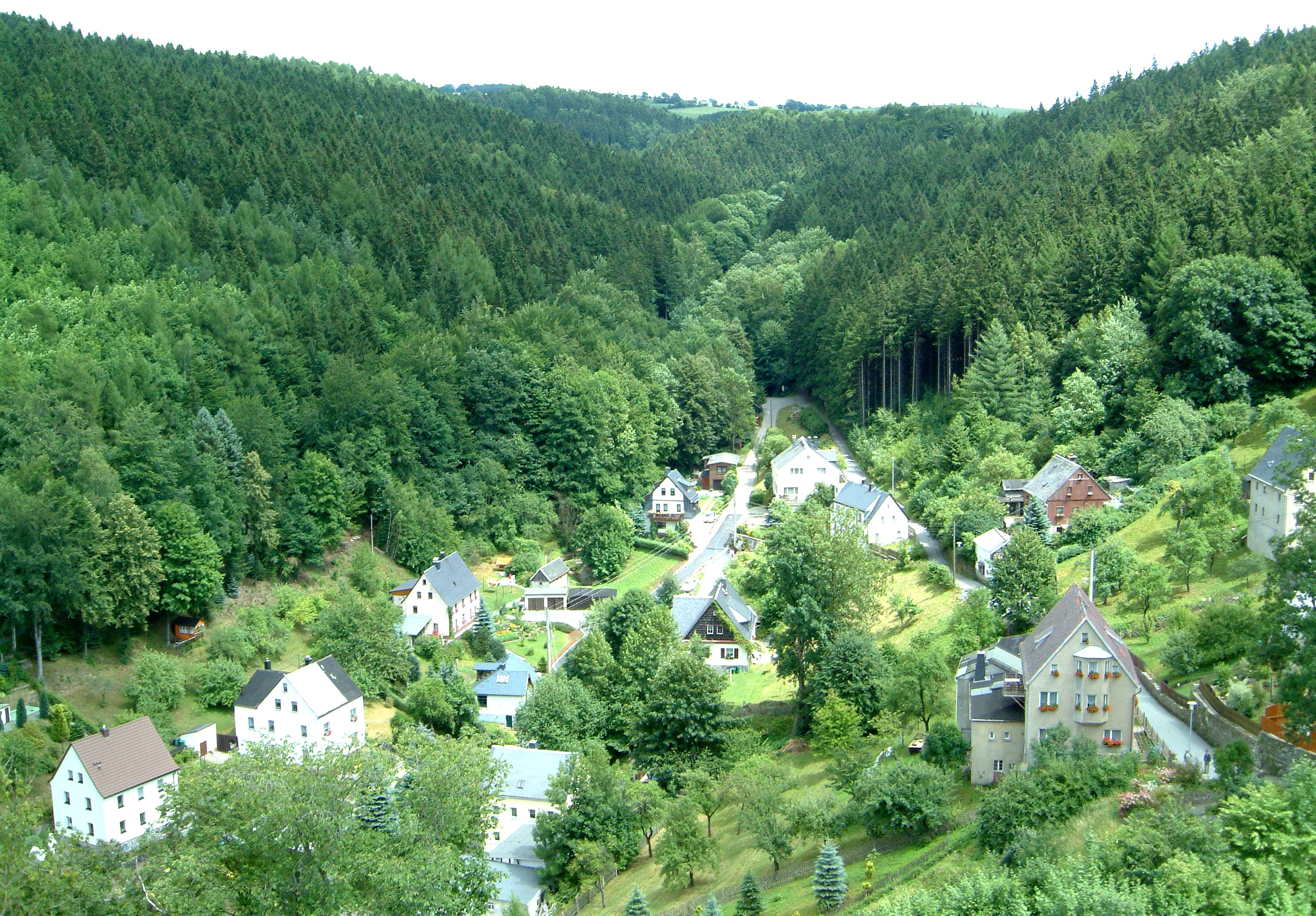
View from the castle of the so-called Geese Corner (Gänsewinkel)

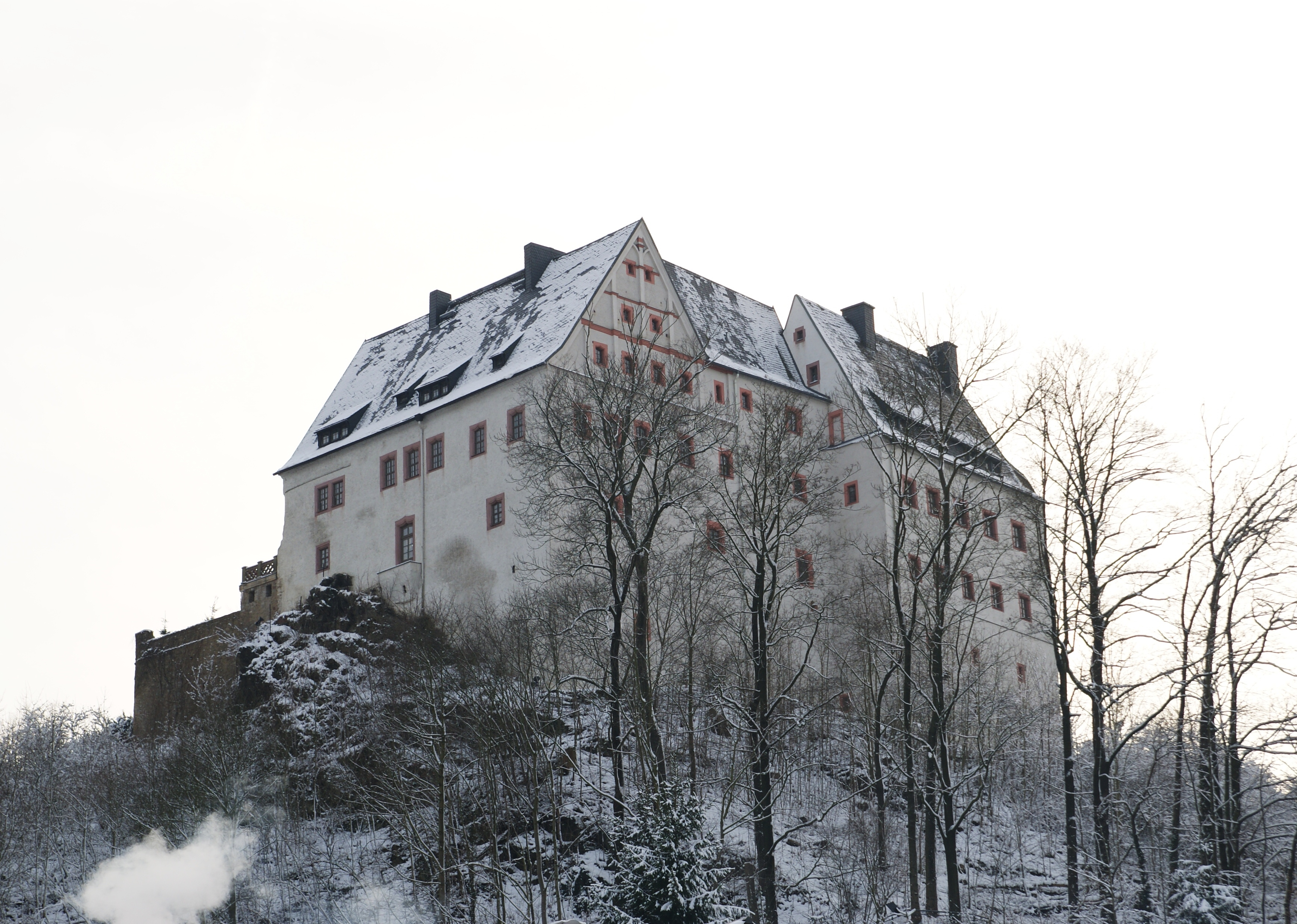
View from the Zschopau river bank car park

== Literature ==
- Otto Eduard Schmidt: Die wiedererstandene Burg Scharfenstein an der Zschopau. in: Mitteilungen des Landesverein Sächsischer Heimatschutz Vol. XIII, Heft 9-10/1924, Dresden, 1924, pp. 316–332
- Richard Steche: Scharfenstein. In: Beschreibende Darstellung der älteren Bau- und Kunstdenkmäler des Königreichs Sachsen, 5. Heft: Amtshauptmannschaft Marienberg. C. C. Meinhold, Dresden, 1885, p. 28.
