= Grießbach =

Coordinates: 50°43′N 13°3′E

Grießbach is a village and a former municipality in the Ore Mountains in Saxony, Germany. It was absorbed into the municipality Venusberg in 1999, and became part of the municipality Drebach in January 2010. It counts approximately 690 inhabitants.

== History ==
Grießbach in the morning

The village first appeared in an official document in 1386. In 1539 it built a Christian community with Drebach. Since 1850 there has existed a street connecting the village and the next big town, Zschopau. A railroad was built next to the street so the mining for limestone could flourish. In 1929 the mining industry was called off and a concentration on agriculture began.

During World War II, parts of Grießbach were destroyed by bombs. After the war the Soviet Union settled down in Grießbach to search for uranium but they only found tons of ore.

During the time of the GDR DKK (Deutsches Kühl- und Kältekombinat) opened a factory for the production of refrigerators which were sold to countries all over the eastern European countries. The factory closed just before the reunion with West Germany. Today Mogatec uses the factory buildings for the production of garden tools.
