= Drebach =

- Municipality
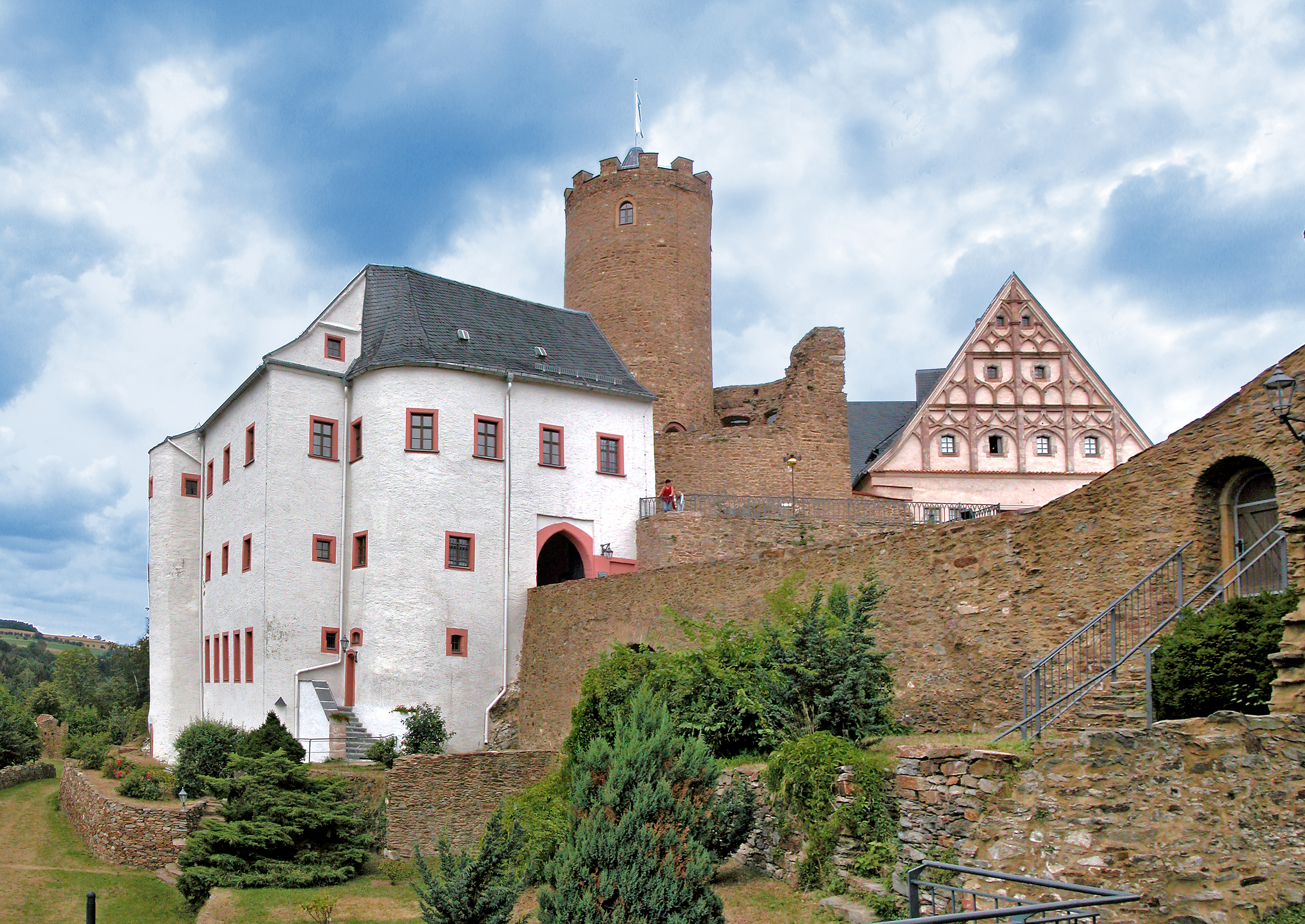
- Scharfenstein Castle

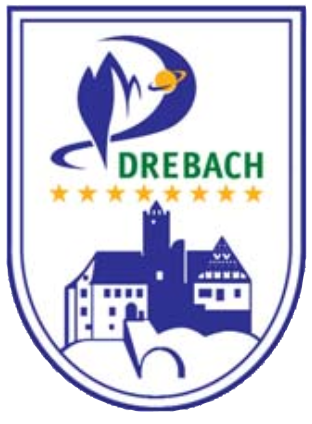
- Coat of arms

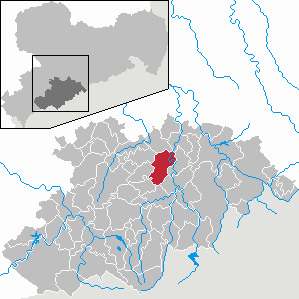
- Location of Drebach within Erzgebirgskreis district
- Interactive map of Drebach
- Location within Germany Location within Saxony
- Coordinates: 50°40′24″N 13°01′05″E
- Country: Germany
- State: Saxony
- District: Erzgebirgskreis

Government
  - Mayor (2017–24): Jens Haustein (CDU)

Area
  - Total: 32.74 km^{2} (12.64 sq mi)
- Elevation: 477 m (1,565 ft)

Population (2025-12-31)
  - Total: 4,788
  - Density: 146.2/km^{2} (378.8/sq mi)
- Time zone: UTC+01:00 (CET)
  - Summer (DST): UTC+02:00 (CEST)
- Postal codes: 09430, 09435
- Dialling codes: 03725, 037341, 037369
- Vehicle registration: ERZ, ANA, ASZ, AU, MAB, MEK, STL, SZB, ZP
- Website: www.gemeinde-drebach.de

Drebach is a municipality in the district of Erzgebirgskreis, in Saxony, Germany. It consists of the Ortsteile (divisions) Drebach, Grießbach, Im Grund, Scharfenstein, Spinnerei, Venusberg, Wilischthal and Wiltzsch.

== Sights ==
=== Scharfenstein Castle ===
Scharfenstein Castle is located in the Village of Scharfenstein in the valley of the river Zschopau. It houses, amongst other things, a permanent exhibition of Ore Mountain folk art under the title Longing For the Light (Sehnsucht nach dem Licht) by Hamburg collector, Andreas Martin, and a number of craftsmen's workshops.
