= Scharfenstein Castle (Kiedrich) =

- Burg Scharfenstein
- Kiedrich
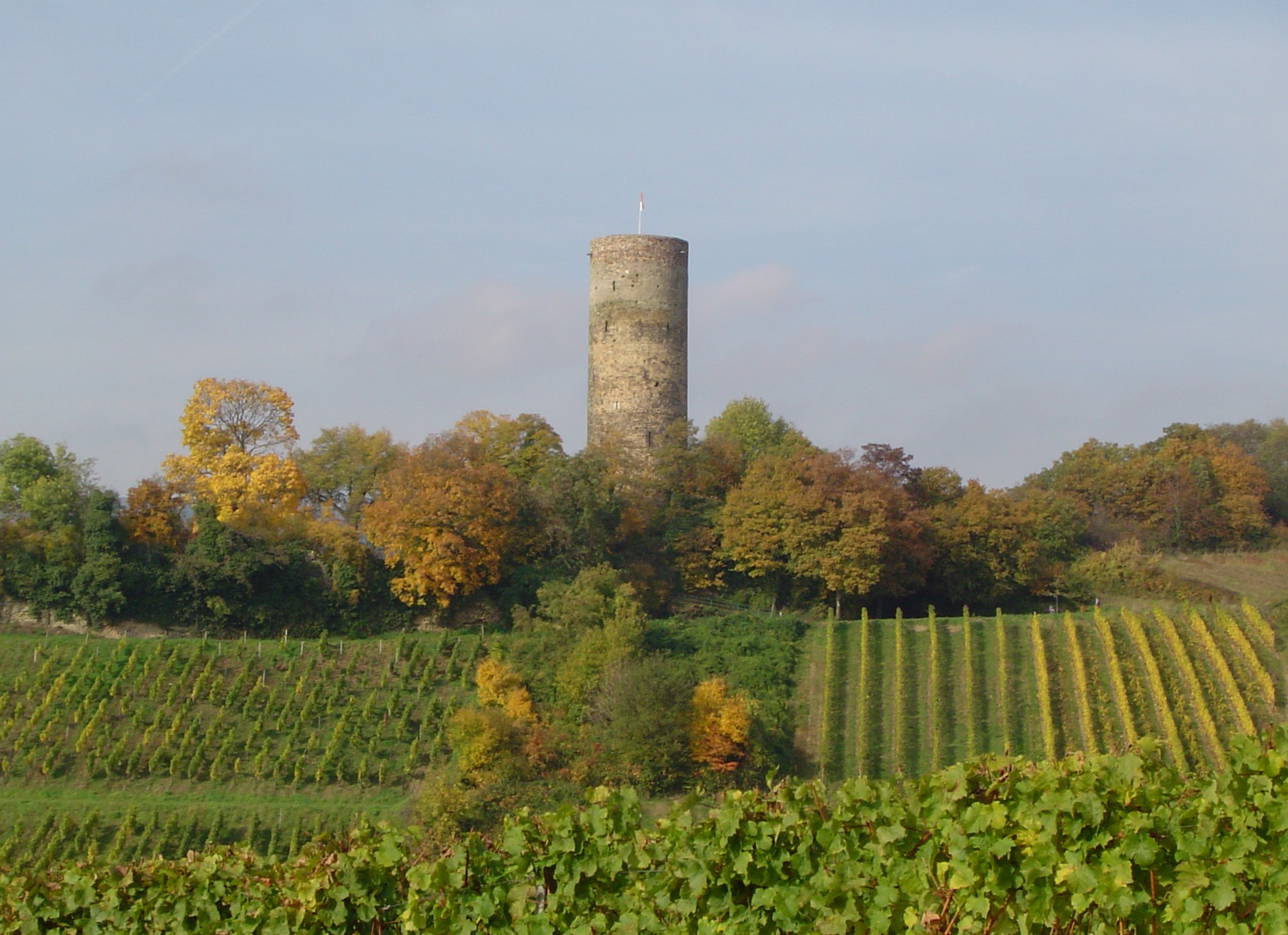
- Castle Scharfenstein (east side)

Site information
- Type: Medieval castle

Location
- Coordinates: 50°2′51.7″N 8°4′53.4″E

Site history
- Built: 1160; 866 years ago

Scharfenstein Castle (German: Burg Scharfenstein), a ruined castle near the town of Kiedrich in Hesse, Germany, was part of the Bishopric of Mainz's border fortifications. It was erected in 1160 under Christian I (Archbishop of Mainz).

== Sources and external links ==
- Burgruine Scharfenstein auf kiedricher-geschichte in German.
